= 2004–05 Aston Villa F.C. season =

English football club season

Aston Villa
2004–05 season
- Chairman: Doug Ellis
- Manager: David O'Leary
- FA Premier League: 10th
- FA Cup: Third round
- League Cup: Third round
- Top goalscorer: League: Nolberto Solano (8); All: Nolberto Solano; Juan Pablo Ángel (9)
Home colours	Away colours

Second City Derby
- 46--36--28

The 2004–05 English football season was Aston Villa's 13th season in the Premier League and their second season under the management of David O'Leary.

Villa went into the season with high hopes after finishing sixth during the 2003–04 FA Premier League season, despite an inconsistent start Villa soon begun to string wins together and threaten the top six but in the run up to Christmas Villas form dropped alarmingly and they fell away quickly, occasional wins put any relegation worry's astray as they underachieved and eventually secured a tenth-place finish.

There were debuts for Steven Davis (91), Martin Laursen (84), Carlton Cole (27), Mathieu Berson (11), and Eric Djemba-Djemba (11).

Kit Supplier	Sponsor
Hummel	DWS Investments

== Premier League ==
Pos	Team	Pld	W	D	L	GF	GA	GD	Pts
8	Manchester City	38	13	13	12	47	39	+8	52
9	Tottenham Hotspur	38	14	10	14	47	41	+6	52
10	Aston Villa	38	12	11	15	45	52	−7	47
11	Charlton Athletic	38	12	10	16	42	58	−16	46
12	Birmingham City	38	11	12	15	40	46	−6	45

Rules for classification: 1) points; 2) goal difference; 3) number of goals scored.

=== Matches ===
Matchday	1	2	3	4	5	6	7	8	9	10	11	12	13	14	15	16	17	18	19	20	21	22	23	24	25	26	27	28	29	30	31	32	33	34	35	36	37	38
Ground	H	A	A	H	H	A	H	A	A	H	A	H	A	H	A	H	H	A	A	H	H	A	H	A	A	H	A	H	H	A	A	H	A	H	H	A	H	A
Result	W	D	L	W	D	D	D	D	L	W	D	W	W	W	L	D	L	L	L	L	W	L	W	L	D	L	W	L	W	L	W	D	W	D	D	L	L	L
Position	2	3	10	5	7	7	8	8	11	8	10	6	5	5	6	6	6	8	10	11	9	9	10	10	11	11	10	10	10	11	10	10	9	9	9	10	10	10

A = Away; H = Home; W = Win; D = Draw; L = Loss

14 August 2004 1	Aston Villa	2–0	Southampton	Birmingham
	Vassell 12'; Cole 34'			Stadium: Villa Park; Attendance: 36,690

22 August 2004 2	West Bromwich Albion	1–1	Aston Villa	West Bromwich
	Clement 38'		Mellberg 4'	Stadium: The Hawthorns; Attendance: 26,485

25 August 2004 3	Charlton Athletic	3–0	Aston Villa	London
	Jeffers 29', 34'; Young 39'			Stadium: The Valley; Attendance: 26,161

28 August 2004 4	Aston Villa	4–2	Newcastle United	Birmingham
	Mellberg 4'; Cole 53'; Barry 71'; Ángel 82'		Kluivert 28'; O'Brien 36'	Stadium: Villa Park; Attendance: 36,305

11 September 2004 5	Aston Villa	0–0	Chelsea	Birmingham
				Stadium: Villa Park; Attendance: 36,691

18 September 2004 6	Norwich City	0–0	Aston Villa	Norwich
				Stadium: Carrow Road; Attendance: 23,805

25 September 2004 7	Aston Villa	1–1	Crystal Palace	Birmingham
	Hendrie 36'		Johnson 6'	Stadium: Villa Park; Attendance: 34,843

2 October 2004 8	Blackburn Rovers	2–2	Aston Villa	Blackburn
	Ferguson 29'; Emerton 63'		Ángel 25'; Mellberg 80'	Stadium: Ewood Park; Attendance: 20,502

16 October 2004 9	Arsenal	3–1	Aston Villa	London
	Pires 19' (pen.), 71'; Henry 45+1'		Hendrie 3'	Stadium: Highbury; Attendance: 38,137

23 October 2004 10	Aston Villa	2–0	Fulham	Birmingham
	Solano 29'; Hendrie 75'			Stadium: Villa Park; Attendance: 34,460

30 October 2004 11	Everton	1–1	Aston Villa	Liverpool
	Bent 32'		Hendrie 26'	Stadium: Goodison Park; Attendance: 37,816

6 November 2004 12	Aston Villa	3–0	Portsmouth	Birmingham
	Whittingham 18'; Ángel 25'; Solano 40'			Stadium: Villa Park; Attendance: 32,633

13 November 2004 13	Bolton Wanderers	1–2	Aston Villa	Bolton
	Diouf 21'		McCann 41'; Hitzlsperger 88'	Stadium: Reebok Stadium; Attendance: 25,779

22 November 2004 14	Aston Villa	1–0	Tottenham Hotspur	Birmingham
	Solano 57'			Stadium: Villa Park; Attendance: 35,702

27 November 2004 15	Manchester City	2–0	Aston Villa	Manchester
	Macken 29'; Wright-Phillips 37'		Hendrie (red card) 90+1'	Stadium: City of Manchester Stadium; Attendance: 45,805

4 December 2004 16	Aston Villa	1–1	Liverpool	Birmingham
	Solano 44'		Kewell 16'	Stadium: Villa Park; Attendance: 42,593

12 December 2004 17	Aston Villa	1–2	Birmingham City	Birmingham
	Barry 90+2'		Morrison 9'; Dunn 18'	Stadium: Villa Park; Attendance: 41,329

18 December 2004 18	Middlesbrough	3–0	Aston Villa	Middlesbrough
	Hasselbaink 20'; Job 69'; Reiziger 88'			Stadium: Riverside Stadium; Attendance: 31,338

26 December 2004 19	Chelsea	1–0	Aston Villa	London
	Duff 30'			Stadium: Stamford Bridge; Attendance: 41,988

28 December 2004 20	Aston Villa	0–1	Manchester United	Birmingham
			Giggs 41'	Stadium: Villa Park; Attendance: 42,593

1 January 2005 21	Aston Villa	1–0	Blackburn Rovers	Birmingham
	Solano 88'			Stadium: Villa Park; Attendance: 34,265

3 January 2005 22	Crystal Palace	2–0	Aston Villa	London
	Johnson 33', 65' (pen.)			Stadium: Selhurst Park; Attendance: 24,140

15 January 2005 23	Aston Villa	3–0	Norwich City	Birmingham
	Ridgewell 9'; Hendrie 27'; Solano 76'			Stadium: Villa Park; Attendance: 34,265

22 January 2005 24	Manchester United	3–1	Aston Villa	Manchester
	Ronaldo 8'; Saha 69'; Scholes 70'		Barry 53'	Stadium: Old Trafford; Attendance: 67,859

2 February 2005 25	Fulham	1–1	Aston Villa	London
	Clark 90+4'		Ángel 54'	Stadium: Craven Cottage; Attendance: 17,624

5 February 2005 26	Aston Villa	1–3	Arsenal	Birmingham
	Ángel 73'		Ljungberg 10'; Henry 14'; Cole 28'	Stadium: Villa Park; Attendance: 42,593

12 February 2005 27	Portsmouth	1–2	Aston Villa	Portsmouth
	Yakubu 23' (pen.)		de Zeeuw 17' (o.g.); Hitzlsperger 73'	Stadium: Fratton Park; Attendance: 20,160

26 February 2005 28	Aston Villa	1–3	Everton	Birmingham
	Solano 46'		Osman 17', 67'; Cahill 48'	Stadium: Villa Park; Attendance: 40,248

5 March 2005 29	Aston Villa	2–0	Middlesbrough	Birmingham
	Laursen 64'; Moore 79'			Stadium: Villa Park; Attendance: 34,201

20 March 2005 30	Birmingham City	2–0	Aston Villa	Birmingham
	Heskey 52'; Gray 89'			Stadium: St Andrews; Attendance: 29,382

2 April 2005 31	Newcastle United	0–3	Aston Villa	Newcastle upon Tyne
	Taylor (red card) 73'; Dyer (red card) 81'; Bowyer (red card) 82'		Ángel 4'; Barry 73' (pen.), 80' (pen.)	Stadium: St James' Park; Attendance: 52,306

10 April 2005 32	Aston Villa	1–1	West Bromwich Albion	Birmingham
	Vassell 27'; Ridgewell (red card) 61'		Greening (red card) 61'; Robinson 90+3'	Stadium: Villa Park; Attendance: 39,402

16 April 2005 33	Southampton	2–3	Aston Villa	Southampton
	Phillips 4'; Crouch 13'		Cole 55'; Solano 70'; Davis 72'	Stadium: St Mary's; Attendance: 31,926

20 April 2005 34	Aston Villa	0–0	Charlton Athletic	Birmingham
				Stadium: Villa Park; Attendance: 31,312

23 April 2005 35	Aston Villa	1–1	Bolton Wanderers	Birmingham
	Hierro 26' (o.g.)		Speed 53'	Stadium: Villa Park; Attendance: 36,053

1 May 2005 36	Tottenham Hotspur	5–1	Aston Villa	London
	Kanouté 6', 27'; King 19'; Reid 67'; Kelly 90'		Barry 45' (pen.)	Stadium: White Hart Lane; Attendance: 36,101

7 May 2005 37	Aston Villa	1–2	Manchester City	Birmingham
	Ángel 61'		Wright-Phillips 5'; Musampa 12'	Stadium: Villa Park; Attendance: 39,645

15 May 2005 38	Liverpool	2–1	Aston Villa	Liverpool
	Cissé 20' (pen.), 27'		Barry 67'	Stadium: Anfield; Attendance: 43,406

== FA Cup ==
8 January 2005 Round 3	Sheffield United	3–1	Aston Villa	Sheffield
	Cullip 55'; Liddell 82', 83'		Barry 47'	Stadium: Bramall Lane; Attendance: 14,003

== League Cup ==
22 September 2004 Round 2	Aston Villa	3–1	Queens Park Rangers	Birmingham
	Vassell 29'; Ángel 38'; Solano 78'		McLeod 48'	Stadium: Villa Park; Attendance: 26,975

26 October 2004 Round 3	Burnley	3–1	Aston Villa	Burnley
	Branch 9'; Camara 65'; Valois 86'		Ángel 81'	Stadium: Turf Moor; Attendance: 11,184

== Players ==
=== First-team squad ===
As of end of season

No.	Pos	Nat	Player	Total		Premiership		FA Cup		League Cup	
No.	Pos	Nat	Player	Apps	Goals	Apps	Goals	Apps	Goals	Apps	Goals
Goalkeepers
1	GK	(Denmark) DEN	Thomas Sørensen	39	0	36	0	1	0	2	0
13	GK	(Netherlands) NED	Stefan Postma	3	0	2+1	0	0	0	0	0
Defenders
2	DF	(Wales) WAL	Mark Delaney	32	0	30	0	1	0	1	0
3	DF	(Trinidad and Tobago) TTO	Jlloyd Samuel	38	0	34+1	0	1	0	2	0
4	DF	(Sweden) SWE	Olof Mellberg	33	3	30	3	1	0	2	0
5	DF	(Denmark) DEN	Martin Laursen	12	1	12	1	0	0	0	0
15	DF	(Ecuador) ECU	Ulises de la Cruz	35	0	30+4	0	0	0	1	0
19	DF	(England) ENG	Liam Ridgewell	17	1	12+3	1	1	0	1	0
Midfielders
6	MF	(England) ENG	Gareth Barry	36	8	33+1	7	1	1	1	0
7	MF	(England) ENG	Lee Hendrie	32	5	25+4	5	1	0	2	0
8	MF	(England) ENG	Gavin McCann	23	1	20	1	1	0	2	0
11	MF	(Peru) PER	Nolberto Solano	39	9	32+4	8	1	0	2	1
12	MF	(Germany) GER	Thomas Hitzlsperger	30	2	17+11	2	0	0	0+2	0
14	MF	(Cameroon) CMR	Eric Djemba-Djemba	6	0	4+2	0	0	0	0	0
16	MF	(France) FRA	Mathieu Berson	13	0	7+4	0	0+1	0	0+1	0
17	MF	(England) ENG	Peter Whittingham	15	1	5+8	1	0	0	2	0
24	MF	(Northern Ireland) NIR	Steven Davis	29	1	19+9	1	0+1	0	0	0
Forwards
9	FW	(Colombia) COL	Juan Pablo Ángel	38	9	30+5	7	1	0	2	2
10	FW	(England) ENG	Darius Vassell	22	3	17+4	2	0	0	1	1
18	FW	(England) ENG	Carlton Cole	30	3	18+9	3	1	0	1+1	0
22	FW	(England) ENG	Luke Moore	27	1	5+20	1	0+1	0	0+1	0
26	FW	(England) ENG	Stefan Moore	1	0	0+1	0	0	0	0	0

Last updated: 31 June 2005
Source: Competitions

Squad at end of season

Note: Flags indicate national team as defined under FIFA eligibility rules; some limited exceptions apply. Players may hold more than one non-FIFA nationality.

No.	Pos.	Nation	Player
1	GK	DEN	Thomas Sørensen
2	DF	WAL	Mark Delaney
3	DF	ENG	Jlloyd Samuel (Note: Samuel was born in San Fernando, Trinidad and Tobago, but also qualified to represent England internationally and would represent them at U-21 level and be called up to the senior team before switching his international allegiance to Trinidad and Tobago and making his international debut for Trinidad and Tobago in September 2009.)
4	DF	SWE	Olof Mellberg (captain)
5	DF	DEN	Martin Laursen
6	MF	ENG	Gareth Barry
7	MF	ENG	Lee Hendrie
8	MF	ENG	Gavin McCann
9	FW	COL	Juan Pablo Ángel
10	MF	ENG	Darius Vassell
11	MF	PER	Nolberto Solano

No.	Pos.	Nation	Player
12	MF	GER	Thomas Hitzlsperger
13	GK	NED	Stefan Postma
14	MF	CMR	Eric Djemba-Djemba
15	DF	ECU	Ulises de la Cruz
16	MF	FRA	Mathieu Berson
17	MF	ENG	Peter Whittingham
18	FW	ENG	Carlton Cole (on loan from Chelsea)
19	DF	ENG	Liam Ridgewell
22	FW	ENG	Luke Moore
24	MF	NIR	Steven Davis
26	FW	ENG	Stefan Moore

=== Transfers ===
Left club during season Note: Flags indicate national team as defined under FIFA eligibility rules; some limited exceptions apply. Players may hold more than one non-FIFA nationality.

No. / Pos. / Nation / Player; 14 / FW / SWE / Marcus Allbäck (to Hansa Rostock)	No. / Pos. / Nation / Player; — / DF / NOR / Ronny Johnsen (to Newcastle United)

Transferred in

Date	Pos	Player	From	Fee
21 May 2004	CB	(Denmark) Martin Laursen	(Italy) Milan	£3,000,000
6 August 2004	CM	(France) Mathieu Berson	(France) Nantes	£1,600,000
31 January 2005	DM	(Cameroon) Eric Djemba-Djemba	Manchester United	£1,350,000
				£5,950,000

Loaned in

Date	Pos	Player	From	Loan End
11 July 2004	CF	(Czech Republic) Václav Drobný	(France) Strasbourg	31 May 2005

Transferred out

Date	Pos	Player	To	Fee
1 July 2004	CF	Dion Dublin	Leicester City	Free transfer
1 July 2004	AM	(Morocco) Hassan Kachloul	-	Released
9 July 2004	CF	Peter Crouch	Southampton	£2,000,000
20 July 2004	LB	(Wales) Rob Edwards	Wolverhampton Wanderers	£150,000
27 August 2004	CF	(Sweden) Marcus Allbäck	(Germany) Hansa Rostock	Free transfer
16 September 2004	CB	(Norway) Ronny Johnsen	Newcastle United	Free transfer
				£2,150,000

Loaned out

Date	Pos	Player	To	Loan End
3 August 2004	CF	Stefan Moore	Millwall	3 October 2004
10 August 2004	GK	(Republic of Ireland) Wayne Henderson	Notts County	15 October 2004
9 November 2004	CB	Gary Cahill	Burnley	9 November 2004
2 December 2004	GK	(Republic of Ireland) Wayne Henderson	Notts County	26 January 2005
9 December 2004	CM	Stephen Cooke	Wycombe Wanderers	9 January 2005
14 February 2005	RM	Peter Whittingham	Burnley	16 March 2005
11 March 2005	CF	Stefan Moore	Leicester City	31 May 2005

Overall transfer activity

Expenditure ▼£5,950,000

Income ▲£2,150,000

Balance ▼£3,800,000

=== Reserve & Youth squad ===
Note: Flags indicate national team as defined under FIFA eligibility rules; some limited exceptions apply. Players may hold more than one non-FIFA nationality.

No.	Pos.	Nation	Player
20	DF	CZE	Václav Drobný (on loan from Strasbourg)
25	GK	IRL	Wayne Henderson
30	FW	ENG	Gabriel Agbonlahor
—	DF	ENG	Stuart Bridges
—	DF	ENG	Gary Cahill
—	DF	ENG	James O'Connor

No.	Pos.	Nation	Player
—	DF	IRL	Kevin Mulcahy
—	MF	ENG	Stephen Cooke
—	MF	ENG	Kyle Nix (Note: Nix was born in Sydney, Australia, but was raised in England and represented England at U-16, U-18, U-20, and C level.)
—	MF	IRL	Stephen Foley-Sheridan
—	FW	NIR	Jamie Ward (Note: Ward was born in Birmingham, England, but also qualifies to represent Northern Ireland internationally through his grandfather and represented them at U-19 and U-21 level before making his international debut for Northern Ireland in August 2011.)
—	FW	FIN	Mika Ääritalo

Youth squad Note: Flags indicate national team as defined under FIFA eligibility rules; some limited exceptions apply. Players may hold more than one non-FIFA nationality.

No.	Pos.	Nation	Player
—	GK	IRL	Stephen Henderson
—	GK	AUT	Bobby Olejnik
—	GK	FIN	Jon Masalin
—	DF	ENG	Ashley Edkins
—	DF	ENG	Paul Green
—	DF	ENG	Michael Tuohy
—	DF	IRL	Stephen O'Halloran
—	DF	DEN	Magnus Troest
—	MF	ENG	Morgan Evans
—	MF	ENG	Phil Green
—	MF	ENG	Jonathan Hogg
—	MF	ENG	Isaiah Osbourne
—	MF	IRL	John Paul Kelly (on trial)

No.	Pos.	Nation	Player
—	MF	BEL	Christian Tshimanga Kabeya (Note: Kabeya was born in Kinshasa, Zaire (now the Democratic Republic of the Congo), but also qualifies to represent Belgium internationally and represented them at U-16, U-17, U-18 and U-19 level.)
—	FW	ENG	Sam Baldock (on trial from Milton Keynes Dons)
—	FW	ENG	Scott Bridges
—	FW	ENG	Shane Paul
—	FW	ENG	Sam Williams
—	FW	NIR	Adam McGurk
—	FW	CIV	Amadou Kouman
—	DF		Seyi Morgan
—	DF		Matt Saunders
—	MF		Rowan Caney
—			Ashley Carew
—			Andrew Malpass

Other players

The following players did not play for any Aston Villa team this season.

Note: Flags indicate national team as defined under FIFA eligibility rules; some limited exceptions apply. Players may hold more than one non-FIFA nationality.

No.	Pos.	Nation	Player
—	GK	IRL	David Bevan
—	GK	IRL	Lee Boyle
—	DF	ENG	Jordan Collins
—	DF	ENG	Lee Grant (on loan to York City)

No.	Pos.	Nation	Player
—	DF	AUS	Shane Lowry (Note: Lowry was born in Perth, Australia, but also qualifies to represent the Republic of Ireland internationally through his parents and represented them at U-17 and U-21 level before switching his international allegiance to Australia.)
—	MF	ENG	Nathan Jackson
—	MF	ENG	Dan McDonald
—	MF	AUS	Chris Herd

== Pre-season ==
Date	Opponents	Home/ Away	Result F – A	Scorers	Competition
21 July 2005	Kungshamns IF (Sweden)	A	6 – 0		Friendly
22 July 2004	Kungsbacka BI (Sweden)	A	7 – 2		Friendly
24 July 2004	Jonkopings Sodra (Sweden)	A	3 – 0		Friendly
27 July 2004	Orgryte (Sweden)	A	0 – 0		Friendly
30 July 2004	Walsall	A	1 – 2		Friendly
31 July 2004	Tamworth	A	3 – 0		Friendly
3 August 2004	Derby	A	1 – 2		Friendly
7 August 2004	AZ Alkmaar (Netherlands)	A	1 – 0		Friendly
