= 2005–06 Aston Villa F.C. season =

English football club season

Aston Villa
2005–06 season
- Chairman: Doug Ellis
- Manager: David O'Leary
- FA Premier League: 16th
- FA Cup: Fifth round
- League Cup: Fourth round
- Top goalscorer: Milan Baroš and Luke Moore (8)
- Average home league attendance: 34,059
Home colours	Away colours

Second City Derby
- 48--36--28

The 2005–06 English football season was Aston Villa's 14th season in the Premier League

After the previous seasons tenth-placed finish Villa never recovered from a poor start which left them at times close to the bottom 3 and despite some impressive wins which ultimately kept Villa in the league discontent among the fans at an uncomfortable relegation battle grew and lead to manager David O'Leary being sacked after the end of the season.

There were debut appearances for Gabriel Agbonlahor (341), James Milner (100), Wilfred Bouma (83), Craig Gardner (59), Aaron Hughes (54), Milan Baroš (42), Patrik Berger (29), Gary Cahill (28), Kevin Phillips (23), Eirik Bakke (14), and Stuart Taylor (12).

Kit Supplier	Sponsor
Hummel	DWS Investments

== Premier League ==
Pos	Team	Pld	W	D	L	GF	GA	GD	Pts	Qualification or relegation
14	Middlesbrough	38	12	9	17	48	58	−10	45	
15	Manchester City	38	13	4	21	43	48	−5	43	
16	Aston Villa	38	10	12	16	42	55	−13	42	
17	Portsmouth	38	10	8	20	37	62	−25	38	
18	Birmingham City (R)	38	8	10	20	28	50	−22	34	Relegation to the Football League Championship

Source: Barclays Premier League
Rules for classification: 1) points; 2) goal difference; 3) number of goals scored.
(R) Relegated

Aston Villa's score comes first

Win	Draw	Loss

Overall								Home						Away					
Pld	W	D	L	GF	GA	GD	Pts	W	D	L	GF	GA	GD	W	D	L	GF	GA	GD
38	10	12	16	42	55	−13	42	6	6	7	20	20	0	4	6	9	22	35	−13

Last updated: 8 October 2021.
Source: 11v11

Results per matchday

Matchday	1	2	3	4	5	6	7	8	9	10	11	12	13	14	15	16	17	18	19	20	21	22	23	24	25	26	27	28	29	30	31	32	33	34	35	36	37	38
Ground	H	A	A	H	A	H	A	H	A	H	A	H	A	H	A	A	H	H	A	H	A	H	A	H	A	H	A	H	A	A	H	A	H	H	A	H	A	H
Result	D	L	D	W	D	L	L	L	W	L	L	L	W	W	D	D	L	W	D	D	W	L	D	D	W	L	D	W	L	L	D	L	D	W	L	L	L	W
Position	5	12	13	8	14	11	15	16	14	15	16	16	15	14	15	14	15	14	13	13	12	15	15	14	12	15	15	14	14	14	15	16	15	15	15	16	16	16

Updated to match(es) played on 7 May 2006. Source: WorldFootball.net
A = Away; H = Home; W = Win; D = Draw; L = Loss

=== Matches ===
13 August 2005	Aston Villa	2–2	Bolton Wanderers
	Phillips, Davis	Report		Attendance: 38,026

20 August 2005	Manchester United	1–0	Aston Villa
		Report		Attendance: 67,934

23 August 2005	Portsmouth	1–1	Aston Villa
	Hughes (own goal)	Report		Attendance: 19,778

27 August 2005	Aston Villa	1–0	Blackburn Rovers
	Baroš	Report		Attendance: 31,010

12 September 2005	West Ham United	4–0	Aston Villa
		Report		Attendance: 29,582

17 September 2005	Aston Villa	1–1	Tottenham Hotspur
	Milner	Report		Attendance: 33,686

24 September 2005	Chelsea	2–1	Aston Villa
		Report	Moore	Attendance: 42,146

2 October 2005	Aston Villa	2–3	Middlesbrough
	Moore, Davis	Report		Attendance: 29,719

16 October 2005	Birmingham City	0–1	Aston Villa
		Report	Phillips	Attendance: 29,312

22 October 2005	Aston Villa	0–2	Wigan Athletic
		Report		Attendance: 32,294

31 October 2005	Manchester City	3–1	Aston Villa
		Report	Ridgewell	Attendance: 42,069

5 November 2005	Aston Villa	0–2	Liverpool
		Report		Attendance: 42,551

19 November 2005	Sunderland	1–3	Aston Villa
		Report	Phillips, Barry, Baroš	Attendance: 39,707

26 November 2005	Aston Villa	1–0	Charlton Athletic
	Davis	Report		Attendance: 30,023

3 December 2005	Newcastle United	1–1	Aston Villa
		Report	McCann	Attendance: 18,255

10 December 2005	Bolton Wanderers	1–1	Aston Villa
		Report	Angel	Attendance: 23,646

17 December 2005	Aston Villa	0–2	Manchester United
		Report		Attendance: 37,128

26 December 2005	Aston Villa	4–0	Everton
	Baroš (2), Delaney, Angel	Report		Attendance: 32,432

28 December 2005	Fulham	3–3	Aston Villa
		Report	Moore, Ridgewell (2)	Attendance: 20,446

31 December 2005	Aston Villa	0–0	Arsenal
		Report		Attendance: 37,114

2 January 2006	West Bromwich Albion	1–2	Aston Villa
		Report	Davis, Baroš (pen)	Attendance: 27,073

14 January 2006	Aston Villa	1–2	West Ham United
	Hendrie	Report		Attendance: 36,700

21 January 2006	Tottenham Hotspur	0–0	Aston Villa
		Report		Attendance: 36,243

1 February 2006	Aston Villa	1–1	Chelsea
	Moore	Report		Attendance: 38,562

4 February 2006	Middlesbrough	0–4	Aston Villa
		Report	Moore (3), Phillips	Attendance: 27,299

11 February 2006	Aston Villa	1–2	Newcastle United
	Moore	Report		Attendance: 37,140

25 February 2006	Charlton Athletic	0–0	Aston Villa
		Report		Attendance: 26,594

4 March 2006	Aston Villa	1–0	Portsmouth
	Baroš	Report		Attendance: 30,194

11 March 2006	Blackburn Rovers	2–0	Aston Villa
		Report		Attendance: 21,932

18 March 2006	Everton	4–1	Aston Villa
		Report	Agbonlahor	Attendance: 36,507

25 March 2006	Aston Villa	0–0	Fulham
		Report		Attendance: 32,605

1 April 2006	Arsenal	5–0	Aston Villa
		Report		Attendance: 38,183

9 April 2006	Aston Villa	0–0	West Bromwich Albion
		Report		Attendance: 33,303

16 April 2006	Aston Villa	3–1	Birmingham City
	Baroš (2), Cahill	Report		Attendance: 40,158

18 April 2006	Wigan Athletic	3–2	Aston Villa
		Report	Angel, Ridgewell	Attendance: 17,330

25 April 2006	Aston Villa	0–1	Manchester City
		Report		Attendance: 26,422

29 April 2006	Liverpool	3–1	Aston Villa
		Report	Barry	Attendance: 44,479

7 May 2006	Aston Villa	2–1	Sunderland
	Barry, Ridgewell	Report		Attendance: 33,820

== FA Cup ==
Round	Date	Opponent	Venue	Result	Attendance	Goalscorers
R3	7 January 2006	Hull City	A	1–0	17,051	Barry
R4	28 January 2006	Port Vale	H	3–1	30,434	Baroš (2), Davis
R5	19 February 2006	Manchester City	H	1–1	23,847	Baroš
R5R	14 March 2006	Manchester City	A	1–2	33,006	Davis

== League Cup ==
Round	Date	Opponent	Venue	Result	Attendance	Goalscorers
R2	20 September 2005	Wycombe Wanderers	A	8–3	5,365	Davis (2), Baroš, Milner (2), Easton (own goal), Barry (2, 1 pen)
R3	22 October 2005	Burnley	H	1–0	26,872	Phillips
R4	29 November 2005	Doncaster Rovers	A	0–3	10,590	

== Players ==
=== First-team squad ===
Squad at end of season

No.	Pos	Nat	Player	Total		Premiership		FA Cup		League Cup	
No.	Pos	Nat	Player	Apps	Goals	Apps	Goals	Apps	Goals	Apps	Goals
Goalkeepers
1	GK	(Denmark) DEN	Thomas Sørensen	43	0	36	0	4	0	3	0
13	GK	(England) ENG	Stuart Taylor	2	0	2	0	0	0	0	0
Defenders
2	DF	(Wales) WAL	Mark Delaney	16	1	12	1	3	0	1	0
3	DF	(England) ENG	Jlloyd Samuel	24	0	14+5	0	2	0	3	0
4	DF	(Sweden) SWE	Olof Mellberg	33	0	27	0	4	0	2	0
5	DF	(Denmark) DEN	Martin Laursen	1	0	1	0	0	0	0	0
15	DF	(Ecuador) ECU	Ulises de la Cruz	8	0	4+3	0	0	0	0+1	0
16	DF	(Netherlands) NED	Wilfred Bouma	21	0	20	0	1	0	0	0
18	DF	(Northern Ireland) NIR	Aaron Hughes	41	0	35	0	4	0	2	0
19	DF	(England) ENG	Liam Ridgewell	37	5	30+2	5	1+1	0	3	0
21	DF	(England) ENG	Gary Cahill	8	1	6+1	1	0	0	1	0
Midfielders
6	MF	(England) ENG	Gareth Barry	42	6	36	3	3	1	3	2
7	MF	(England) ENG	Lee Hendrie	19	1	7+9	1	2	0	0+1	0
8	MF	(England) ENG	Gavin McCann	38	1	32	1	4	0	2	0
11	MF	(England) ENG	James Milner	33	3	27	1	3	0	3	2
12	MF	(Northern Ireland) NIR	Steven Davis	42	8	34+1	4	4	2	3	2
14	MF	(Cameroon) CMR	Eric Djemba-Djemba	4	0	0+4	0	0	0	0	0
17	MF	(England) ENG	Peter Whittingham	4	0	4	0	0	0	0	0
23	MF	(Czech Republic) CZE	Patrik Berger	9	0	3+5	0	0	0	1	0
26	MF	(England) ENG	Craig Gardner	9	0	3+5	0	0+1	0	0	0
Forwards
9	FW	(Colombia) COL	Juan Pablo Ángel	37	4	12+19	3	2+1	1	3	0
10	FW	(Czech Republic) CZE	Milan Baroš	30	11	24+1	8	3	2	2	1
20	FW	(England) ENG	Kevin Phillips	27	5	20+3	4	1+1	0	1+1	1
22	FW	(England) ENG	Luke Moore	32	8	16+11	8	3	0	0+2	0
30	FW	(England) ENG	Gabriel Agbonlahor	9	1	3+6	1	0	0	0	0
Players who left club during season
11	MF	(Peru) PER	Nolberto Solano	3	0	2+1	0	0	0	0	0
24	MF	(Norway) NOR	Eirik Bakke	14	0	8+6	0	0	0	0	0

Last updated: 31 June 2006
Source: Competitions

Note: Flags indicate national team as defined under FIFA eligibility rules; some limited exceptions apply. Players may hold more than one non-FIFA nationality.

No.	Pos.	Nation	Player
1	GK	DEN	Thomas Sørensen
2	DF	WAL	Mark Delaney
3	DF	ENG	Jlloyd Samuel
4	DF	SWE	Olof Mellberg
5	DF	DEN	Martin Laursen
6	MF	ENG	Gareth Barry
7	MF	ENG	Lee Hendrie
8	MF	ENG	Gavin McCann
9	FW	COL	Juan Pablo Ángel
10	FW	CZE	Milan Baroš
11	MF	ENG	James Milner (on loan from Newcastle United)
12	MF	NIR	Steven Davis
13	GK	ENG	Stuart Taylor

No.	Pos.	Nation	Player
14	MF	CMR	Eric Djemba-Djemba
15	DF	ECU	Ulises de la Cruz
16	DF	NED	Wilfred Bouma
17	MF	ENG	Peter Whittingham
18	DF	NIR	Aaron Hughes
19	DF	ENG	Liam Ridgewell
20	FW	ENG	Kevin Phillips
21	DF	ENG	Gary Cahill
22	FW	ENG	Luke Moore
23	MF	CZE	Patrik Berger
26	MF	ENG	Craig Gardner
30	FW	ENG	Gabriel Agbonlahor

=== Transfers ===
Left club during season Note: Flags indicate national team as defined under FIFA eligibility rules; some limited exceptions apply. Players may hold more than one non-FIFA nationality.

No.	Pos.	Nation	Player
11	MF	PER	Nolberto Solano (to Newcastle United)
16	MF	FRA	Mathieu Berson (on loan to Auxerre)
24	MF	NOR	Eirik Bakke (on loan from Leeds United)

No.	Pos.	Nation	Player
25	GK	IRL	Wayne Henderson (to Brighton & Hove Albion)
—	GK	NED	Stefan Postma (to Wolverhampton Wanderers)
—	MF	IRL	Steven Foley (to AFC Bournemouth)

Transferred in

Date	Pos	Player	From	Fee
20 May 2005	RB	(Northern Ireland) Aaron Hughes	Newcastle United	£1,000,000
27 June 2005	GK	Stuart Taylor	Arsenal	£1,000,000
29 June 2005	CF	Kevin Phillips	Southampton	£1,000,000
1 July 2005	LM	(Czech Republic) Patrik Berger	Portsmouth	Free transfer
23 August 2005	CF	(Czech Republic) Milan Baroš	Liverpool	£6,500,000
30 August 2005	LB	(Netherlands) Wilfred Bouma	(Netherlands) PSV Eindhoven	£3,500,000
				£13,000,000

Loaned in

Date	Pos	Player	From	Loan End
31 August 2005	RM	James Milner	Newcastle United	31 May 2006
31 August 2005	CM	(Norway) Eirik Bakke	Leeds United	17 January 2006

Transferred out

Date	Pos	Player	To	Fee
1 July 2005	CM	Stephen Cooke	Bournemouth	Free transfer
1 July 2005	LM	(Germany) Thomas Hitzlsperger	(Germany) Stuttgart	Free transfer
1 July 2005	CF	Stefan Moore	Queens Park Rangers	Free transfer
27 July 2005	CF	Darius Vassell	Manchester City	£2,000,000
31 August 2005	RM	(Peru) Nolberto Solano	Newcastle United	£1,500,000
6 January 2006	GK	(Netherlands) Stefan Postma	Wolverhampton Wanderers	£500,000
20 January 2006	GK	(Republic of Ireland) Wayne Henderson	Brighton & Hove Albion	£60,000
31 August 2005	CM	(Republic of Ireland) Steven Foley-Sheridan	Bournemouth	£20,000
				£4,080,000

Loaned out

Date	Pos	Player	To	Loan End
19 August 2005	GK	(Netherlands) Stefan Postma	Wolverhampton Wanderers	5 January 2006
25 August 2005	CM	(France) Mathieu Berson	(France) Auxerre	31 May 2006
14 September 2005	RM	Peter Whittingham	Notts County	19 November 2005
22 September 2005	CF	Gabriel Agbonlahor	Watford	22 October 2005
28 October 2005	CF	Gabriel Agbonlahor	Sheffield Wednesday	28 December 2005
20 January 2006	CF	Sam Williams	(Wales) Wrexham	31 May 2006

Overall transfer activity

Expenditure ▼£13,000,000

Income ▲£4,080,000

Balance ▼£8,920,000

=== Reserve & youth squad ===
Note: Flags indicate national team as defined under FIFA eligibility rules; some limited exceptions apply. Players may hold more than one non-FIFA nationality.

No.	Pos.	Nation	Player
—	DF	ENG	Steven Clancy
—	DF	ENG	Lee Grant
—	DF	ENG	Paul Green
—	DF	ENG	Matthew Roome

No.	Pos.	Nation	Player
—	MF	BEL	Christian Tshimanga Kabeya (Note: Kabeya was born in Kinshasa, Zaire (now the Democratic Republic of the Congo), but also qualifies to represent Belgium internationally and represented them at U-16, U-17, U-18 and U-19 level.)
—	FW	ENG	Shane Paul
—	FW	NIR	Jamie Ward (Note: Ward was born in Birmingham, England, but also qualifies to represent Northern Ireland internationally through his grandfather and represented them at U-19 and U-21 level before making his international debut for Northern Ireland in August 2011.)
—			Daniel Bridges

Youth squad Note: Flags indicate national team as defined under FIFA eligibility rules; some limited exceptions apply. Players may hold more than one non-FIFA nationality.

No.	Pos.	Nation	Player
39	GK	AUT	Bobby Olejnik
—	GK	IRL	Lee Boyle
—	GK	IRL	Stephen Henderson
—	DF	ENG	Ciaran Clark (Note: Clark was born in Harrow, England, and represented them at U-17, U-18, U-19, and U-20 level, but also qualifies to represent the Republic of Ireland internationally and would make his international debut for the Republic of Ireland in February 2011.)
—	DF	ENG	Jordan Collins
—	DF	IRL	Danny Earls
—	DF	IRL	Shane Lowry (Note: Lowry was born in Perth, Australia, but also qualifies to represent the Republic of Ireland internationally through his parents and represented them at U-17, U-19, and U-21 level before switching his international allegiance to Australia.)
—	DF	IRL	Stephen O'Halloran
—	DF	SWE	Erik Lund
—	MF	ENG	Marc Albrighton
—	MF	ENG	Morgan Evans
—	MF	ENG	Phil Green
—	MF	ENG	Jonathan Hogg

No.	Pos.	Nation	Player
—	MF	ENG	Dan McDonald
—	MF	ENG	Isaiah Osbourne
—	MF	HUN	Zoltán Stieber
—	MF	AUS	Chris Herd
—	FW	ENG	Scott Bridges
—	FW	ENG	Sam Williams
—	FW	NIR	Adam McGurk
—	FW	SWE	Tobias Mikaelsson
—	DF		Seyi Morgan
—	DF		Matt Saunders
—			Lee McGuire
—			Lee Mussell
—			Reuben Reid

Other players

The following players did not play for any Aston Villa team this season.

Note: Flags indicate national team as defined under FIFA eligibility rules; some limited exceptions apply. Players may hold more than one non-FIFA nationality.

No.	Pos.	Nation	Player
—	GK	IRL	David Bevan
—	GK	ENG	Elliot Parish
—	DF	ENG	Jordan Collins

No.	Pos.	Nation	Player
—	MF		Rowan Caney
—			Ashley Carew

== Pre-season ==
Date	Opponents	Home/ Away	Result F – A	Scorers	Competition
18 July 2005	Wycombe Wanderers	A	2 – 0		Friendly
20 July 2005	Gallstad FK (Sweden)	A	14 – 0		Friendly
23 July 2005	Jonkopings Sodra (Sweden)	A	1 – 1		Friendly
26 July 2005	GAIS (Sweden)	A	3 – 3		Friendly
30 July 2005	Wolverhampton Wanderers	A	1 – 2		Friendly
2 August 2005	Walsall	A	3 – 0		Friendly
5 August 2005	Utrecht (Netherlands)	A	2 – 1		Friendly
