= 2003–04 Aston Villa F.C. season =

English football club season

Aston Villa
2003–04 season
- Chairman: Doug Ellis
- Manager: David O'Leary
- Stadium: Villa Park
- FA Premier League: 6th
- FA Cup: Third round
- League Cup: Semi-finals
- Top goalscorer: Juan Pablo Ángel (16)
- Average home league attendance: 36,621
| Home colours | Away colours |

Second City Derby
- 46--34--28

The 2003–04 English football season was Aston Villa's 12th season in the Premier League. David O'Leary, the sacked Leeds United manager, was appointed Villa manager in the summer of 2003.

Under O'Leary, Villa made a very sluggish start to the campaign and found themselves in the relegation zone after winning just two of their first 13 league fixtures. They were still in the bottom three in mid-December before O'Leary galvanized them and they gradually climbed the table. Villa had a fantastic second half of the season and, with two matches remaining, had a chance of qualifying for the Champions League. After extending their unbeaten run to eight games by drawing at Southampton, defeat against Manchester United at Villa Park consigned them to sixth place. The Villains finished five points short of a Champions League place and were edged out of a UEFA Cup spot on goal difference by Newcastle United.

Nevertheless, it was still a great achievement by O'Leary, who appeared to get the best out of the likes of Gareth Barry, Lee Hendrie, Jlloyd Samuel and 16-goal Juan Pablo Ángel. The Colombian was the club's leading scorer, while Darius Vassell bagged 9 goals to cement his place in England's Euro 2004 squad. Thomas Sørensen and Gavin McCann both had excellent seasons after moving from Sunderland, while Nolberto Solano quickly became a fans' favourite after his mid-season move from Newcastle.

Among the men to represent Villa for the last time during 2003–04 was Dion Dublin, who netted 48 goals in 155 league games. O'Leary's side reached the last four of the Football League Cup by knocking out Wycombe Wanderers, Leicester City, Crystal Palace and Chelsea. The semi-final first leg, at Bolton, ended in a disappointing 5–2 defeat. Villa Park goals by Thomas Hitzlsperger and Samuel were not quite enough to prevent the Trotters from clinching a place in the final. Manchester United came from behind to knock Villa out of the FA Cup in a third round tie at Villa Park. Despite narrowly missing out on qualifying for Europe, the mood around Villa Park was extremely positive in the summer of 2004. With the likes of Liam Ridgewell, Steven Davis, Peter Whittingham and the Moore brothers (Stefan and Luke) forcing open the first team door, David O'Leary had an abundance of young talent at his disposal.

| Kit Supplier | Sponsor |
|---|---|
| Diadora | Rover / MG* |

*Rover sponsored the home shirts, MG sponsored the away

== Premier League ==
| Pos | Team | Pld | W | D | L | GF | GA | GD | Pts | Qualification or relegation |
|---|---|---|---|---|---|---|---|---|---|---|
| 4 | Liverpool | 38 | 16 | 12 | 10 | 55 | 37 | +18 | 60 | Qualification for the Champions League third qualifying round (Note: Since Manchester United qualified for the Champions League, their place in the UEFA Cup as 2003–04 FA Cup winners went to First Division club Millwall, who were the FA Cup runners-up.) |
| 5 | Newcastle United | 38 | 13 | 17 | 8 | 52 | 40 | +12 | 56 | Qualification for the UEFA Cup first round |
| 6 | Aston Villa | 38 | 15 | 11 | 12 | 48 | 44 | +4 | 56 | |
| 7 | Charlton Athletic | 38 | 14 | 11 | 13 | 51 | 51 | 0 | 53 | |
| 8 | Bolton Wanderers | 38 | 14 | 11 | 13 | 48 | 56 | −8 | 53 | |

Source: Premier League
Rules for classification: 1) points; 2) goal difference; 3) number of goals scored.
Notes:

Matches

| 16 August 2003 | Portsmouth | 2–1 | Aston Villa | Fratton Park |
| | | Report | Barry 82' (pen) | Attendance: 20,101 |

| 24 August 2003 | Aston Villa | 0–0 | Liverpool | Villa Park |
| | | Report | | Attendance: 42,573 |

| 27 August 2003 | Arsenal | 2–0 | Aston Villa | Arsenal Stadium |
| | | Report | | Attendance: 38,010 |

| 30 August 2003 | Aston Villa | 3–1 | Leicester City | Villa Park |
| | Thatcher 8' (og), Ángel 10', 16' | Report | | Attendance: 32,274 |

| 14 September 2003 | Manchester City | 4–1 | Aston Villa | City of Manchester Stadium |
| | | Report | Ángel 31' | Attendance: 46,687 |

| 20 September 2003 | Aston Villa | 2–1 | Charlton Athletic | Villa Park |
| | Alpay 37', Samuel 55' | Report | | Attendance: 31,410 |

| 27 September 2003 | Chelsea | 1–0 | Aston Villa | Stamford Bridge |
| | | Report | | Attendance: 41,182 |

| 5 October 2003 | Aston Villa | 1–1 | Bolton Wanderers | Villa Park |
| | Ángel 58' | Report | | Attendance: 30,229 |

| 19 October 2003 | Birmingham City | 0–0 | Aston Villa | St Andrew's |
| | | Report | | Attendance: 29,546 |

| 25 October 2003 | Aston Villa | 0–0 | Everton | Villa Park |
| | | Report | | Attendance: 36,146 |

| 1 November 2003 | Newcastle United | 1–1 | Aston Villa | St James' Park |
| | | Report | Dublin 11' | Attendance: 51,975 |

| 8 November 2003 | Aston Villa | 0–2 | Middlesbrough | Villa Park |
| | | Report | | Attendance: 29,898 |

| 23 November 2003 | Tottenham Hotspur | 2–1 | Aston Villa | White Hart Lane |
| | | Report | Allbäck 66' | Attendance: 33,140 |

| 29 November 2003 | Aston Villa | 1–0 | Southampton | Villa Park |
| | Dublin 45' | Report | | Attendance: 31,285 |

| 6 December 2003 | Manchester United | 4–0 | Aston Villa | Old Trafford |
| | | Report | | Attendance: 67,621 |

| 14 December 2003 | Aston Villa | 3–2 | Wolves | Reebok Stadium |
| | Ángel 21', 24', Barry 48' | Report | | Attendance: 36,964 |

| 20 December 2003 | Blackburn Rovers | 0–2 | Aston Villa | Ewood Park |
| | S. Moore 62', Ángel 75' | Report | | Attendance: 20,722 |

| 26 December 2003 | Leeds United | 0–0 | Aston Villa | Elland Road |
| | | Report | | Attendance: 38,513 |

| 28 December 2003 | Aston Villa | 3–0 | Fulham | Villa Park |
| | Ángel 33', Vassell 67', 82' | Report | | Attendance: 35,617 |

| 6 January 2004 | Aston Villa | 2–1 | Portsmouth | Villa Park |
| | Ángel 22', Vassell 85' | Report | | Attendance: 28,625 |

| 10 January 2004 | Liverpool | 1–0 | Aston Villa | Anfield |
| | | Report | | Attendance: 43,771 |

| 18 January 2004 | Aston Villa | 0–2 | Arsenal | Villa Park |
| | | Report | | Attendance: 39,380 |

| 31 January 2004 | Leicester City | 0–5 | Aston Villa | Walkers Stadium |
| | | Report | Vassell 50', 60', Crouch 57', 68', Dublin 64' | Attendance: 31,056 |

| 7 February 2004 | Aston Villa | 2–0 | Leeds United | Villa Park |
| | Ángel 45' (pen), Johnsen 59' | Report | | Attendance: 39,171 |

| 11 February 2004 | Fulham | 1–2 | Aston Villa | Craven Cottage |
| | Ángel 13', Vassell 32' | Report | | Attendance: 16,153 |

| 22 February 2004 | Aston Villa | 2–2 | Birmingham City | Villa Park |
| | Vassell 21', Hitzlsperger 47' | Report | | Attendance: 40,061 |

| 28 February 2004 | Everton | 2–0 | Aston Villa | Goodison Park |
| | | Report | | Attendance: 39,353 |

| 14 March 2004 | Wolves | 0–4 | Aston Villa | Molineux Stadium |
| | | Report | Hitzlsperger 7', Mellberg 18', Ángel 24', 59' | Attendance: 29,386 |

| 20 March 2004 | Aston Villa | 0–2 | Blackburn Rovers | Villa Park |
| | | Report | | Attendance: 37,532 |

| 27 March 2004 | Charlton Athletic | 1–2 | Aston Villa | Valley Parade |
| | | Report | Vassell 24', Samuel 54' | Attendance: 26,250 |

| 4 April 2004 | Aston Villa | 1–1 | Manchester City | Villa Park |
| | Ángel 21' | Report | | Attendance: 37,602 |

| 10 April 2004 | Bolton Wanderers | 2–2 | Aston Villa | Reebok Stadium |
| | | Report | Crouch 18', Hendrie 53' | Attendance: 26,374 |

| 12 April 2004 | Aston Villa | 3–2 | Chelsea | Villa Park |
| | Vassell 39' (pen), Hitzlsperger 49', Hendrie 52' | Report | | Attendance: 41,112 |

| 18 April 2004 | Aston Villa | 0–0 | Newcastle United | Villa Park |
| | | Report | | Attendance: 40,786 |

| 24 April 2004 | Middlesbrough | 1–2 | Aston Villa | Riverside Stadium |
| | | Report | Barry 45', Crouch 89' | Attendance: 31,322 |

| 2 May 2004 | Aston Villa | 1–0 | Tottenham Hotspur | Villa Park |
| | Ángel 5' | Report | | Attendance: 42,573 |

| 8 May 2004 | Southampton | 1–1 | Aston Villa | St Mary's Stadium |
| | | Report | Ángel 39' (pen) | Attendance: 32,054 |

| 15 May 2004 | Aston Villa | 0–2 | Manchester United | Villa Park |
| | | Report | | Attendance: 42,573 |

== FA Cup ==
| 4 January 2004 FA Cup | Aston Villa | 1–2 | Manchester United | Villa Park |
| | Barry 19' | Report | | Attendance: 40,371 |

== League Cup ==
| 23 September 2003 League Cup | Wycombe Wanderers | 0–5 | Aston Villa |
| | | Report | Whittingham 14', Ángel 31', 50' (pen), 55', Vassell 86' (pen) | Attendance: 6,072 |
Note: League Cup

| 29 October 2003 League Cup | Aston Villa | 1–0 | Leicester City | Villa Park |
| | Hitzlsperger 75' | Report | | Attendance: 26,729 |
Note: League Cup

| 3 December 2003 League Cup | Aston Villa | 3–0 | Crystal Palace | Villa Park |
| | Symons 22' (og), McCann 70', Ángel 79' | Report | | Attendance: 24,258 |
Note: League Cup

| 17 December 2003 League Cup | Aston Villa | 2–1 | Chelsea | Villa Park |
| | Ángel 16', McCann 78' | Report | | Attendance: 30,414 |
Note: League Cup

| 21 January 2004 League Cup | Bolton Wanderers | 5–2 | Aston Villa | Reebok Stadium |
| | | Report | Ángel 20', 56' | Attendance: 16,302 |
Note: League Cup

| 27 January 2004 League Cup | Aston Villa | 2–0 | Bolton Wanderers | Villa Park |
| | Hitzlsperger 10', Samuel 88' | Report | | Attendance: 36,883 |
Note: League Cup

== Pre-season ==
| Date | Opponents | Home/ Away | Result F – A | Scorers | Competition |
|---|---|---|---|---|---|
| 22 July 2003 | FC TPS Turku (Finland) | A | 3 – 0 | Ángel (2), Vassell | Friendly |
| 24 July 2003 | Pitea (Sweden) | A | 8 – 0 | Allbäck (3), Crouch (3), Alpay, Hendrie | Friendly |
| 26 July 2003 | Umea (Sweden) | A | 4 – 0 | Vassell, Hendrie, Hitzlsperger, McCann | Friendly |
| 28 July 2003 | Bodens BK (Sweden) | A | 4 – 2 | Mellberg, Vassell, Makumbu (og), Crouch | Friendly |
| 1 August 2003 | Walsall | A | 1 – 2 | Vassell | Friendly |
| 2 August 2003 | Tamworth | A | 4 – 1 | Kachloul (2), Cooke, Crouch | Friendly |
| 5 August 2003 | Scunthorpe | A | 5 – 0 | Allbäck (3), Ángel, De la Cruz | Friendly |
| 9 August 2003 | Leeds | N | 2 – 2 | Kachloul, Hitzlsperger (Aston Villa win 4–2 on pens) | Friendly, Dublin Cup |
| 10 August 2003 | St Patricks (Republic of Ireland) | N | 6 – 0 | Ángel (3), Allbäck, Whittingham, Hitzlsperger | Friendly, Dublin Cup |

== Players ==
As of end of season

| No. | Pos | Nat | Player | Total | | Premiership | | FA Cup | | League Cup | |
| No. | Pos | Nat | Player | Apps | Goals | Apps | Goals | Apps | Goals | Apps | Goals |
Goalkeepers
| 1 | GK | (Denmark) DEN | Thomas Sørensen | 45 | 0 | 38 | 0 | 1 | 0 | 6 | 0 |
| 13 | GK | (Netherlands) NED | Stefan Postma | 2 | 0 | 0+2 | 0 | 0 | 0 | 0 | 0 |
Defenders
| 2 | DF | (Wales) WAL | Mark Delaney | 30 | 0 | 23+2 | 0 | 0 | 0 | 5 | 0 |
| 3 | DF | (Trinidad and Tobago) TTO | Jlloyd Samuel | 45 | 3 | 38 | 2 | 1 | 0 | 6 | 1 |
| 4 | DF | (Sweden) SWE | Olof Mellberg | 39 | 1 | 33 | 1 | 1 | 0 | 5 | 0 |
| 15 | DF | (Ecuador) ECU | Ulises de la Cruz | 32 | 0 | 20+8 | 0 | 1 | 0 | 3 | 0 |
| 24 | DF | (England) ENG | Liam Ridgewell | 13 | 0 | 5+6 | 0 | 0 | 0 | 0+2 | 0 |
| 27 | DF | (Norway) NOR | Ronny Johnsen | 27 | 1 | 21+2 | 1 | 1 | 0 | 2+1 | 0 |
Midfielders
| 6 | MF | (England) ENG | Gareth Barry | 43 | 4 | 36 | 3 | 1 | 1 | 6 | 0 |
| 7 | MF | (England) ENG | Lee Hendrie | 37 | 2 | 32 | 2 | 1 | 0 | 4 | 0 |
| 8 | MF | (England) ENG | Gavin McCann | 35 | 2 | 28 | 0 | 1 | 0 | 6 | 2 |
| 11 | MF | (Peru) PER | Nolberto Solano | 10 | 0 | 10 | 0 | 0 | 0 | 0 | 0 |
| 12 | MF | (Germany) GER | Thomas Hitzlsperger | 38 | 5 | 22+10 | 3 | 0+1 | 0 | 2+3 | 2 |
| 17 | MF | (England) ENG | Peter Whittingham | 39 | 1 | 20+12 | 0 | 1 | 0 | 4+2 | 1 |
Forwards
| 9 | FW | (England) ENG | Dion Dublin | 28 | 3 | 12+11 | 3 | 0 | 0 | 4+1 | 0 |
| 10 | FW | (England) ENG | Darius Vassell | 39 | 10 | 26+6 | 9 | 1 | 0 | 5+1 | 1 |
| 14 | FW | (Sweden) SWE | Marcus Allbäck | 19 | 1 | 7+8 | 1 | 0 | 0 | 1+3 | 0 |
| 16 | FW | (England) ENG | Peter Crouch | 18 | 4 | 6+10 | 4 | 0 | 0 | 1+1 | 0 |
| 18 | FW | (Colombia) COL | Juan Pablo Ángel | 39 | 23 | 33 | 16 | 1 | 0 | 5 | 7 |
| 23 | FW | (England) ENG | Stefan Moore | 12 | 1 | 2+6 | 1 | 0+1 | 0 | 1+2 | 0 |
| 31 | FW | (England) ENG | Luke Moore | 7 | 0 | 0+7 | 0 | 0 | 0 | 0 | 0 |
Players transferred or loaned out during the season
| 5 | DF | (Turkey) TUR | Alpay Özalan | 6 | 1 | 4+2 | 1 | 0 | 0 | 0 | 0 |
| 20 | MF | (Morocco) MAR | Mustapha Hadji | 1 | 0 | 0+1 | 0 | 0 | 0 | 0 | 0 |
| 26 | MF | (Republic of Ireland) IRL | Mark Kinsella | 2 | 0 | 2 | 0 | 0 | 0 | 0 | 0 |

Last updated: 31 June 2004
Source: Competitions

First-team squad

Squad at end of season

Note: Flags indicate national team as defined under FIFA eligibility rules; some limited exceptions apply. Players may hold more than one non-FIFA nationality.

| No. | Pos. | Nation | Player |
|---|---|---|---|
| 1 | GK | DEN | Thomas Sørensen |
| 2 | DF | WAL | Mark Delaney |
| 3 | DF | ENG | Jlloyd Samuel (Note: Samuel was born in San Fernando, Trinidad and Tobago, but also qualified to represent England internationally and would represent them at U-21 level and be called up to the senior team before switching his international allegiance to Trinidad and Tobago and making his international debut for Trinidad and Tobago in September 2009.) |
| 4 | DF | SWE | Olof Mellberg |
| 6 | MF | ENG | Gareth Barry |
| 7 | MF | ENG | Lee Hendrie |
| 8 | MF | ENG | Gavin McCann |
| 9 | FW | ENG | Dion Dublin |
| 10 | FW | ENG | Darius Vassell |
| 11 | MF | PER | Nolberto Solano |
| 12 | MF | GER | Thomas Hitzlsperger |

| No. | Pos. | Nation | Player |
|---|---|---|---|
| 13 | GK | NED | Stefan Postma |
| 14 | FW | SWE | Marcus Allbäck |
| 15 | DF | ECU | Ulises de la Cruz |
| 16 | FW | ENG | Peter Crouch |
| 17 | MF | ENG | Peter Whittingham |
| 18 | FW | COL | Juan Pablo Ángel |
| 23 | FW | ENG | Stefan Moore |
| 24 | DF | ENG | Liam Ridgewell |
| 27 | DF | NOR | Ronny Johnsen |
| 31 | FW | ENG | Luke Moore |

=== Transfers ===
Transferred in

| Date | Pos | Player | From | Fee |
|---|---|---|---|---|
| 24 July 2003 | CM | Gavin McCann | Sunderland | £2,250,000 |
| 8 August 2003 | GK | (Denmark) Thomas Sørensen | Sunderland | £2,250,000 |
| 29 January 2004 | RM | (Peru) Nolberto Solano | Newcastle United | £1,500,000 |
| | | | | £6,000,000 |

Loaned in

| Date | Pos | Player | From | Loan End |

Transferred out

Note: Flags indicate national team as defined under FIFA eligibility rules; some limited exceptions apply. Players may hold more than one non-FIFA nationality.

| No. | Pos. | Nation | Player |
|---|---|---|---|
| 5 | DF | TUR | Alpay Özalan (to Incheon United) |
| 19 | FW | CRO | Boško Balaban (to Club Brugge) |
| 20 | MF | MAR | Mustapha Hadji (to Espanyol) |
| 25 | GK | FIN | Peter Enckelman (to Blackburn Rovers) |
| 26 | MF | IRL | Mark Kinsella (to West Bromwich Albion) |

| No. | Pos. | Nation | Player |
|---|---|---|---|
| 28 | DF | ENG | Danny Jackman (to Stockport County) |
| — | GK | WAL | Boaz Myhill (Note: Myhill was born in Modesto, California, United States, but was raised in England from the age of 1, qualifying to represent any of the home nations. He represented England at U-17, U-18, and U-20 level before making his international debut for Wales in March 2008.) (to Hull City) |
| — | DF | ENG | Jon Bewers (to Notts County) |
| — | DF | ENG | Ryan Amoo (to Northampton Town) |

| Date | Pos | Player | To | Fee |
|---|---|---|---|---|
| 1 July 2003 | AM | (Norway) Øyvind Leonhardsen | - | Released |
| 1 July 2003 | CM | (Republic of Ireland) John McGrath | Doncaster Rovers | Free transfer |
| 1 July 2003 | LB | (Republic of Ireland) Steve Staunton | Coventry City | Free transfer |
| 1 July 2003 | CM | Ian Taylor | Derby County | Free transfer |
| 1 July 2003 | LB | Alan Wright | Middlesbrough | Free transfer |
| 23 October 2003 | CB | (Turkey) Alpay Özalan | (South Korea) Incheon United | Free transfer |
| 13 December 2003 | GK | (Wales) Boaz Myhill | Hull City | £50,000 |
| 23 December 2003 | LB | Danny Jackman | Stockport County | £70,000 |
| 6 January 2004 | GK | (Finland) Peter Enckelman | Blackburn Rovers | £150,000 |
| 15 January 2004 | CM | (Republic of Ireland) Mark Kinsella | West Bromwich Albion | Free transfer |
| 21 January 2004 | CF | (Croatia) Boško Balaban | (Belgium) Club Brugge | Free transfer |
| 31 January 2004 | CM | (Morocco) Mustapha Hadji | (Spain) Espanyol | Free transfer |
| 25 March 2004 | CB | Jonathan Bewers | Notts County | Free transfer |
| | | | | £270,000 |

Loaned out

| Date | Pos | Player | To | Loan End |
|---|---|---|---|---|
| 6 August 2003 | GK | (Wales) Boaz Myhill | Macclesfield Town | 6 September 2003 |
| 1 September 2003 | AM | (Morocco) Hassan Kachloul | Wolverhampton Wanderers | 31 May 2004 |
| 4 September 2003 | CF | Peter Crouch | Norwich City | 7 December 2003 |
| 7 November 2003 | GK | (Finland) Peter Enckelman | Blackburn Rovers | 31 December 2003 |
| 15 November 2003 | LB | (Wales) Rob Edwards | Crystal Palace | 21 December 2003 |
| 21 November 2003 | GK | (Wales) Boaz Myhill | Stockport County | 11 December 2003 |
| 11 December 2003 | CF | (Republic of Ireland) Peter Hynes | Doncaster Rovers | 10 January 2004 |
| 12 December 2003 | CF | Luke Moore | Wycombe Wanderers | 12 January 2004 |
| 8 January 2004 | LB | (Wales) Rob Edwards | Derby County | 31 May 2004 |
| 23 January 2004 | CF | (Republic of Ireland) Peter Hynes | Cheltenham Town | 23 February 2004 |
| 13 March 2004 | GK | (Republic of Ireland) Wayne Henderson | Tamworth | 23 March 2004 |
| 19 April 2004 | GK | (Republic of Ireland) Wayne Henderson | Wycombe Wanderers | 31 May 2004 |

Overall transfer activity

Expenditur ▼£6,000,000

Income ▲£270,000

Balance ▼£5,730,000

== Youth & Reserves ==
The following players did not appear for the first team this season, and spent most of the season playing for the reserves.

Note: Flags indicate national team as defined under FIFA eligibility rules; some limited exceptions apply. Players may hold more than one non-FIFA nationality.

| No. | Pos. | Nation | Player |
|---|---|---|---|
| 21 | MF | NIR | Steven Davis |
| 22 | MF | MAR | Hassan Kachloul (on loan to Wolverhampton Wanderers) |
| 29 | DF | WAL | Rob Edwards (Note: Edwards was born in Madeley, England, and represented them at U-16 level, but also qualified to represent Wales internationally through his parents and made his international debut for Wales in March 2003.) |
| 30 | MF | ENG | Stephen Cooke |

| No. | Pos. | Nation | Player |
|---|---|---|---|
| 39 | GK | IRL | Wayne Henderson |
| — | MF | SCO | Colin Marshall (on loan to Clyde) |
| — | FW | IRL | Peter Hynes (on loan to Doncaster Rovers and Cheltenham Town) |

Under-19s

The following players did not appear for the first team this season, and spent most of the season playing for the youth team, but may have also appeared for the reserves.

Note: Flags indicate national team as defined under FIFA eligibility rules; some limited exceptions apply. Players may hold more than one non-FIFA nationality.

| No. | Pos. | Nation | Player |
|---|---|---|---|
| — | GK | ENG | Antoni Pecora |
| — | GK | ENG | Andrew Yarnold |
| — | GK | FIN | Jon Masalin |
| — | DF | ENG | Stuart Bridges |
| — | DF | ENG | Gary Cahill |
| — | DF | ENG | Scott Cormell |
| — | DF | ENG | Lee Grant |
| — | DF | ENG | Nick Green |
| — | DF | ENG | James O'Connor |

| No. | Pos. | Nation | Player |
|---|---|---|---|
| — | DF | IRL | Kevin Mulcahy |
| — | MF | ENG | Neil Kilkenny (Note: Kilkenny was born in Enfield, England, but was raised in Australia and also qualified to represent the Republic of Ireland internationally through his grandparents. He represented England at U-18 and U-20 level and the Republic of Ireland at U-19 level before making his international debut for Australia in June 2006.) (on trial from Arsenal) |
| — | MF | ENG | Kyle Nix (Note: Nix was born in Sydney, Australia, but was raised in England and represented England at U-16, U-18, U-20, and C level.) |
| — | MF | IRL | Stephen Foley-Sheridan |
| — | FW | SCO | Alan Brazil (on loan to Coleraine) |
| — | FW | NIR | Jamie Ward (Note: Ward was born in Birmingham, England, but also qualifies to represent Northern Ireland internationally through his grandfather and represented them at U-19 and U-21 level before making his international debut for Northern Ireland in August 2011.) |
| — | FW | FIN | Mika Ääritalo |
| — | FW | CIV | Amadou Kouman |
| — | MF | | John Grady |

Under-17s

The following players did not appear for the first team this season, and spent most of the season playing for the youth team, but may have also appeared for the reserves.

Note: Flags indicate national team as defined under FIFA eligibility rules; some limited exceptions apply. Players may hold more than one non-FIFA nationality.

| No. | Pos. | Nation | Player |
|---|---|---|---|
| — | GK | ENG | Jake Meredith |
| — | GK | AUT | Bobby Olejnik |
| — | DF | ENG | Ashley Edkins |
| — | DF | ENG | Paul Green |
| — | DF | ENG | Michael Tuohy |
| — | DF | IRL | Stephen O'Halloran |
| — | DF | DEN | Magnus Troest |
| — | MF | ENG | Morgan Evans |
| — | MF | ENG | Craig Gardner |
| — | MF | ENG | Nigel Julien (on trial) |
| — | MF | ENG | Dan McDonald |
| — | MF | ENG | Michael Noakes |
| — | MF | ENG | Isaiah Osbourne |

| No. | Pos. | Nation | Player |
|---|---|---|---|
| — | MF | ENG | Charlie Reeves |
| — | MF | ENG | Jay Sztybel |
| — | MF | BEL | Christian Tshimanga Kabeya (Note: Kabeya was born in Kinshasa, Zaire (now the Democratic Republic of the Congo), but also qualifies to represent Belgium internationally and represented them at U-16, U-17, U-18 and U-19 level.) |
| — | FW | ENG | Gabriel Agbonlahor |
| — | FW | ENG | Scott Bridges |
| — | FW | ENG | Shane Paul |
| — | FW | ENG | Sam Williams |
| — | DF | | Seyi Morgan |
| — | DF | | Matt Saunders |
| — | MF | | Luke Sampson |
| — | | | Abdiligan Abshir |
| — | | | Ross Hughes |

Did not play

The following players did not play for any Aston Villa team this season.

Note: Flags indicate national team as defined under FIFA eligibility rules; some limited exceptions apply. Players may hold more than one non-FIFA nationality.

| No. | Pos. | Nation | Player |
|---|---|---|---|
| — | GK | IRL | Lee Boyle |
| — | DF | IRL | Pierre Ennis (to Dublin City) |
| — | DF | FRA | Youness Bengelloun (on trial from Paris Saint-Germain) |
| — | DF | ISR | Tal Ben Haim (on trial from Maccabi Tel Aviv) |
| — | MF | ENG | Ishmel Demontagnac |
| — | MF | ENG | Daryl Taylor |

| No. | Pos. | Nation | Player |
|---|---|---|---|
| — | MF | IRL | Kenneth Browne |
| — | MF | MLT | André Schembri (on trial from Hibernians) |
| — | MF | COL | Freddy Grisales (on trial from Atlético Nacional) |
| — | GK | | Matthew Allen |
| — | MF | | Rowan Caney |
