= 2002–03 Aston Villa F.C. season =

English football club season

Aston Villa
2002–03 season
- Chairman: Doug Ellis
- Manager: Graham Taylor
- Premier League: 16th
- FA Cup: Third round
- League Cup: Quarter-finals
- UEFA Intertoto Cup: Semi-finals
- Top goalscorer: League: Dion Dublin (10); All: Dion Dublin (14)
Home colours	Away colours

Second City Derby
- 46--34--26

The 2002–03 English football season was Aston Villa's 11th season in the Premier League, and their 15th consecutive season in the top division of English football.

Fans had hoped that the return of successful former manager Graham Taylor would spark a serious challenge for honours once more, but the actual result was Villa's worst Premier League campaign in eight years, with the club in serious danger of relegation throughout the season. Survival was only achieved in the penultimate game of the season with a victory over already-doomed Sunderland; Taylor was soon on his way out of the club for good.

There were debuts for Ulises de la Cruz (89), Ronny Johnsen (49), Marcus Allbäck (35), Mark Kinsella (21), Øyvind Leonhardsen (19), Stefan Postma (13), Joey Guðjónsson (11), and Rob Edwards (8).

A season low was the 3–0 defeat by local rivals Birmingham City at St Andrews. A first-half goal from Clinton Morrison saw Birmingham in control at half time, before a comedy of errors saw a throw-in by Olof Mellberg roll under the foot of Villa goalkeeper Peter Enckelman and into the net to gift Blues a 2–0 lead. Geoff Horsfield added a third later in the game thanks to bad defending from Alpay Özalan. This game was followed by the visit to Villa Park. The game kicked into life when Villa striker Dion Dublin was sent off in the 51st minute for headbutting Robbie Savage. In the 74th minute, Australian Stan Lazaridis scored his first goal of the season, and three minutes later, a poor header back by Jlloyd Samuel allowed Horsfield to run onto the ball, beat Enckelman and score from close range. The game ended with another sending off, as Villa's Joey Guðjónsson lunged at Upson with a two-footed tackle.

Kit Supplier	Sponsor
Diadora	Rover / MG*

*Rover sponsored the home shirts, MG sponsored the away

== Premier League ==
Pos	Team	Pld	W	D	L	GF	GA	GD	Pts	Qualification or relegation
14	Fulham	38	13	9	16	41	50	−9	48	
15	Leeds United	38	14	5	19	58	57	+1	47	
16	Aston Villa	38	12	9	17	42	47	−5	45	
17	Bolton Wanderers	38	10	14	14	41	51	−10	44	
18	West Ham United (R)	38	10	12	16	42	59	−17	42	Relegation to Football League First Division

Source: Premier League
Rules for classification: 1) points; 2) goal difference; 3) number of goals scored.
(R) Relegated

Matches

18 August 2002	Aston Villa	0–1	Liverpool
		Report		Attendance: 41,183

24 August 2002	Tottenham Hotspur	1–0	Aston Villa
		Report		Attendance: 35,384

28 August 2002	Aston Villa	1–0	Manchester City
	Vassell 64'	Report		Attendance: 33,494

1 September 2002	Bolton Wanderers	1–0	Aston Villa
		Report		Attendance: 22,113

11 September 2002	Aston Villa	2–0	Charlton Athletic
	de la Cruz 70', S Moore 83'	Report		Attendance: 26,483

16 September 2002	Birmingham City	3–0	Aston Villa
		Report		Attendance: 29,505

22 September 2002	Aston Villa	3–2	Everton
	Hendrie 7', 48', Dublin 85'	Report		Attendance: 30,023

28 September 2002	Sunderland	1–0	Aston Villa
		Report		Attendance: 40,492

6 October 2002	Aston Villa	0–0	Leeds United
				Attendance: 33,505

21 October 2002	Aston Villa	0–1	Southampton
				Attendance: 25,817

26 October 2002	Manchester United	1–1	Aston Villa
			Mellberg 35'	Attendance: 67,619

3 November 2002	Blackburn Rovers	0–0	Aston Villa
				Attendance: 23,004

9 November 2002	Aston Villa	3–1	Fulham
	Ángel 20', Allbäck 66', Leonhardsen 83'			Attendance: 29,563

16 November 2002	West Bromwich Albion	0–0	Aston Villa
				Attendance: 27,091

23 November 2002	Aston Villa	4–1	West Ham United
	Hendrie 29', Leonhardsen 59', Dublin 72', Vassell 80'			Attendance: 33,279

30 November 2002	Arsenal	3–1	Aston Villa
			Hitzlsperger 64'	Attendance: 38,090

7 December 2002	Aston Villa	0–1	Newcastle United
				Attendance: 33,446

14 December 2002	Aston Villa	2–1	West Bromwich Albion
	Vassell 16', Hitzlsperger 90'			Attendance: 40,391

21 December 2002	Chelsea	2–0	Aston Villa
				Attendance: 38,284

26 December 2002	Manchester City	3–1	Aston Villa
			Dublin 41'	Attendance: 33,991

28 December 2002	Aston Villa	1–0	Middlesbrough
	Dublin 11'			Attendance: 33,637

1 January 2003	Aston Villa	2–0	Bolton Wanderers
	Dublin 8', Vassell 80'			Attendance: 31,838

11 January 2003	Liverpool	1–1	Aston Villa
			Dublin 49' (pen)	Attendance: 43,210

18 January 2003	Aston Villa	0–1	Tottenham Hotspur
				Attendance: 38,576

28 January 2003	Middlesbrough	2–5	Aston Villa
			Vassell 24', 81', Guðjónsson 31', Barry 47', Dublin 90'	Attendance: 27,546

2 February 2003	Aston Villa	3–0	Blackburn Rovers
	Dublin 2', 40', Barry 81'			Attendance: 29,171

8 February 2003	Fulham	2–1	Aston Villa
			Barry 3'	Attendance: 17,092

22 February 2003	Charlton Athletic	3–0	Aston Villa
				Attendance: 26,257

3 March 2003	Aston Villa	0–2	Birmingham City
				Attendance: 42,602

15 March 2003	Aston Villa	0–1	Manchester United
				Attendance: 42,602

22 March 2003	Southampton	2–2	Aston Villa
			Hendrie 30', Vassell 36'	Attendance: 31,888

5 April 2003	Aston Villa	1–1	Arsenal
	K Touré (own goal) 71'			Attendance: 42,602

12 April 2003	West Ham United	2–2	Aston Villa
			Vassell 36' (pen), Leonhardsen 52'	Attendance: 35,029

19 April 2003	Aston Villa	2–1	Chelsea
	Allbäck 11', 78'			Attendance: 39,358

21 April 2003	Newcastle United	1–1	Aston Villa
			Dublin 69'	Attendance: 52,015

26 April 2003	Everton	2–1	Aston Villa
			Allbäck 49'	Attendance: 40,167

3 May 2003	Aston Villa	1–0	Sunderland
	Allbäck 80'			Attendance: 36,963

11 May 2003	Leeds United	3–1	Aston Villa
			Guðjónsson 40'	Attendance: 40,205

== FA Cup ==
Date	Round	Opponents	H / A	Result F – A	Scorers	Attendance
4 January 2003	Round 3	Blackburn Rovers	H	1 – 4	Angel 41'	23,884

== Friendlies ==
Date	Opponents	Home/ Away	Result F – A	Scorers	Competition
20 July 2002	FC Zurich (Switzerland)	A	0 – 2		Intertoto Cup
27 July 2002	FC Zurich (Switzerland)	H	3 – 0	Boulding (33), Allbäck (52), Staunton (77)	Intertoto Cup
August 2002	Lille (France)	A	1 – 1	Taylor (83)	Intertoto Cup
August 2002	Lille (France)	H	0 – 2		Intertoto Cup

== League Cup ==
Date	Round	Opponents	H / A	Result F – A	Scorers	Attendance
2 October 2002	Round 2	Luton Town	H	3 – 0	De La Cruz 9', Dublin (2) 35', 48'	20,833
6 November 2002	Round 3	Oxford United	A	3 – 0	Taylor 74', Barry 77', Dublin 86'	12,177
4 December 2002	Round 4	Preston North End	H	5 – 0	Vassell 44', 55', Dublin 80', Ángel 84', Hitzlsperger 87'	23,042
18 December 2002	Round 5	Liverpool	H	3 – 4	Vassell 23' (pen), Hitzlsperger 72', Henchoz 88 (o.g.)	38,530

== Players ==
Squad at end of season

Note: Flags indicate national team as defined under FIFA eligibility rules; some limited exceptions apply. Players may hold more than one non-FIFA nationality.

No.	Pos.	Nation	Player
1	GK	FIN	Peter Enckelman
2	DF	WAL	Mark Delaney
3	DF	ENG	Alan Wright
4	DF	SWE	Olof Mellberg
5	DF	TUR	Alpay Özalan
6	DF	ENG	Gareth Barry
7	MF	ENG	Ian Taylor
8	FW	COL	Juan Pablo Ángel
9	FW	ENG	Dion Dublin
10	FW	ENG	Darius Vassell
11	DF	IRL	Steve Staunton
12	MF	GER	Thomas Hitzlsperger
13	GK	NED	Stefan Postma
14	FW	SWE	Marcus Allbäck
15	DF	ECU	Ulises de la Cruz

No.	Pos.	Nation	Player
16	FW	ENG	Peter Crouch
17	MF	ENG	Lee Hendrie
19	FW	CRO	Boško Balaban
20	MF	MAR	Mustapha Hadji
21	DF	ENG	Jlloyd Samuel (Note: Samuel was born in San Fernando, Trinidad and Tobago, but also qualified to represent England internationally and would represent them at U-21 level and be called up to the senior team before switching his international allegiance to Trinidad and Tobago and making his international debut for Trinidad and Tobago in September 2009.)
22	MF	MAR	Hassan Kachloul
24	DF	ENG	Liam Ridgewell
25	FW	ENG	Stefan Moore
26	MF	IRL	Mark Kinsella
27	DF	NOR	Ronny Johnsen
28	MF	NOR	Øyvind Leonhardsen
29	MF	ENG	Peter Whittingham
30	DF	WAL	Rob Edwards (Note: Edwards was born in Madeley, England, and represented them at U-16 level, but also qualified to represent Wales internationally through his parents and made his international debut for Wales in March 2003.)
31	DF	ENG	Stephen Cooke
33	DF	ISL	Joey Guðjónsson (on loan from Real Betis)

#	Name	Position	Nationality	Place of birth	Date of birth (age)	Signed from	Date signed	Fee	Apps	Gls
Goalkeepers
1	Peter Enckelman	GK	(Finland)	Turku	10 March 1977 (aged 25)	(Finland) TPS	1 February 1999	£200,000	28	0
13	Stefan Postma	GK	(Netherlands)	Utrecht	6 October 1976 (aged 25)	(Netherlands) De Graafschap	14 May 2002	£1,500,000	-	-
37	Boaz Myhill	GK	(Wales)	(United States) Modesto, CA	9 November 1982 (aged 19)	Academy	1 July 2001	—N/a	0	0
39	Wayne Henderson	GK	(Republic of Ireland)	Dublin	16 September 1983 (aged 18)	Academy	1 July 2001	—N/a	0	0
Defenders
2	Mark Delaney	RB	(Wales)	Haverfordwest	13 May 1976 (aged 26)	(Wales) Cardiff City	9 March 1999	£250,000	98	1
3	Alan Wright	LB	(England)	Ashton-under-Lyne	28 September 1971 (aged 30)	Blackburn Rovers	10 March 1995	£1,000,000	318	5
4	Olof Mellberg	CB	(Sweden)	Gullspång	3 September 1977 (aged 24)	(Spain) Racing Santander	19 July 2001	£5,000,000	36	0
5	Alpay Özalan	CB	(Turkey)	İzmir	30 May 1973 (aged 28)	(Turkey) Fenerbahçe	28 July 2000	£5,600,000	60	0
11	Steve Staunton	LB	(Republic of Ireland)	Dundalk	19 January 1969 (aged 33)	Liverpool	6 December 2000	Free transfer	319	17
15	Ulises de la Cruz	RB	(Ecuador)	Piquiucho	8 February 1974 (aged 28)	(Scotland) Hibernian	26 July 2002	£1,000,000	-	-
21	Jlloyd Samuel	LB	(Trinidad and Tobago)	San Fernando	29 March 1981 (aged 21)	Academy	1 January 1999	—N/a	43	0
24	Liam Ridgewell	CB	(England)	Bexleyheath	21 July 1984 (aged 17)	Academy	1 July 2002	—N/a	-	-
27	Ronny Johnsen	CB	(Norway)	Sandefjord	10 June 1969 (aged 33)	Manchester United	29 August 2002	Free transfer	-	-
30	Rob Edwards	LB	(Wales)	(England) Telford	25 December 1982 (aged 19)	Academy	1 July 2002	—N/a	-	-
Midfielders
6	George Boateng	CM	(Netherlands)	(Ghana) Nkawkaw	5 September 1975 (aged 26)	Coventry City	20 July 1999	£4,500,000	134	5
6*	Gareth Barry	LM	(England)	Hastings	23 February 1981 (aged 21)	Academy	1 January 1998	—N/a	149	4
7	Ian Taylor	CM	(England)	Birmingham	4 June 1968 (aged 34)	Sheffield Wednesday	21 December 1994	£1,000,000	273	40
10	Paul Merson (c)	AM	(England)	Harlesden	20 March 1968 (aged 34)	Middlesbrough	8 September 1998	£6,750,000	144	19
12	Thomas Hitzlsperger	LM	(Germany)	Munich	5 April 1982 (aged 20)	(Germany) Bayern Munich	5 August 2000	Free transfer	13	1
17	Lee Hendrie	RM	(England)	Solihull	18 May 1977 (aged 25)	Academy	1 July 1995	—N/a	185	20
18	Steve Stone	RM	(England)	Gateshead	20 August 1971 (aged 30)	Nottingham Forest	11 March 1999	£5,500,000	120	7
20	Mustapha Hadji	LM	(Morocco)	Ifrane Atlas-Saghir	16 November 1971 (aged 30)	Coventry City	7 July 2001	£4,500,000	32	3
22	Hassan Kachloul	AM	(Morocco)	Agadir	19 February 1973 (aged 29)	Southampton	1 July 2001	—N/a	31	2
26	Mark Kinsella	CM	(Republic of Ireland)	Dublin	12 August 1972 (aged 29)	Charlton Athletic	23 August 2002	£1,000,000	-	-
28	Øyvind Leonhardsen	AM	(Norway)	Kristiansund	17 August 1970 (aged 31)	Tottenham Hotspur	30 August 2002	Free transfer	-	-
29	Peter Whittingham	RM	(England)	Nuneaton	15 February 1983 (aged 19)	Academy	1 July 2002	—N/a	-	-
31	Stephen Cooke	CM	(England)	Walsall	15 February 1983 (aged 19)	Academy	1 July 2000	—N/a	1	0
33	Joey Guðjónsson	CM	(Iceland)	Akranes	25 May 1980 (aged 22)	(Spain) Real Betis	20 January 2003	Loan	-	-
38	John McGrath	CM	(Republic of Ireland)	Limerick	27 March 1980 (aged 22)	Academy	1 July 1999	—N/a	3	0
40	Keith Fahey	LM	(Republic of Ireland)	Dublin	15 January 1983 (aged 19)	Academy	1 July 2002	—N/a	-	-
Forwards
8	Juan Pablo Ángel	CF	(Colombia)	Medellín	24 October 1975 (aged 26)	(Argentina) River Plate	13 January 2001	£9,500,000	45	17
9	Dion Dublin	CF	(England)	Leicester	22 April 1969 (aged 33)	Coventry City	5 November 1998	£5,750,000	127	41
10*	Darius Vassell	CF	(England)	Birmingham	13 June 1980 (aged 22)	Academy	1 January 1998	—N/a	102	21
14	Marcus Allbäck	CF	(Sweden)	Gothenburg	5 July 1973 (aged 28)	(Netherlands) Heerenveen	18 May 2002	£2,000,000	-	-
16	Peter Crouch	CF	(England)	Macclesfield	30 January 1981 (aged 20)	Portsmouth	27 March 2002	£5,000,000	7	2
19	Boško Balaban	CF	(Croatia)	Rijeka	15 October 1978 (aged 23)	(Croatia) Dinamo Zagreb	24 October 2001	£5,800,000	11	0
23	Michael Boulding	CF	(England)	Sheffield	8 February 1976 (aged 26)	Grimsby Town	8 July 2002	Free transfer	-	-
25	Stefan Moore	CF	(England)	Birmingham	28 September 1983 (aged 18)	Academy	1 July 2001	—N/a	0	0
32	Luke Moore	CF	(England)	Birmingham	13 February 1986 (aged 16)	Academy	1 January 2003	—N/a	-	-
42	Peter Hynes	CF	(Republic of Ireland)	Dublin	28 November 1983 (aged 18)	Academy	1 July 2001	—N/a	0	0

*squad number was re-used following a players departure.
Note: Stats and ages are correct as of July 1, 2002.

=== Transfers ===
In

#	Pos	Player	From	Fee	Date
33	MF	(Iceland) Joey Guðjónsson	(Spain) Real Betis	Loan	January 2003
14	FW	(Sweden) Marcus Allbäck	(Netherlands) SC Heerenveen	£2,000,000	July 2002
27	DF	(Norway) Ronny Johnsen	(England) Manchester United F.C.	Free	July 2002
15	DF	(Colombia) Ulises de la Cruz	(Scotland) Hibernian F.C.	£1,000,000	July 2002
26	MF	(Republic of Ireland) Mark Kinsella	(England) Charlton Athletic F.C.	£1,000,000	July 2002
28	MF	(Norway) Øyvind Leonhardsen	(England) Tottenham Hotspur F.C.	Free	July 2002
13	GK	(Netherlands) Stefan Postma	(Netherlands) De Graafschap	£1,500,000	July 2002
23	FW	(England) Michael Boulding	(England) Grimsby Town F.C.	Free	July 2002

Out

#	Pos	Player	To	Fee	Date
10	MF	(England) Paul Merson	(England) Portsmouth	Free	June 2002
6	MF	(Netherlands) George Boateng	(England) Middlesbrough	£5,000,000	June 2002
1	GK	(Denmark) Peter Schmeichel	(England) Manchester City	Free	June 2002
19	FW	(Croatia) Boško Balaban	(Croatia) Dinamo Zagreb	Loan	June 2002
43	DF	(England) Liam Ridgewell	(England) Bournemouth	Loan	August 2002
24	MF	(Republic of Ireland) John McGrath	(England) Dagenham & Redbridge	Loan	November 2002
N/A	MF	(England) Jay Smith	(England) Southend United	Free	November 2002
18	MF	(England) Steve Stone	(England) Portsmouth	Free	December 2002
23	FW	(England) Michael Boulding	(England) Grimsby Town	Free	January 2003
7	MF	(England) Ian Taylor	(England) Derby County	Released	August 2003

Left club during season
Note: Flags indicate national team as defined under FIFA eligibility rules; some limited exceptions apply. Players may hold more than one non-FIFA nationality.

No.	Pos.	Nation	Player
6	MF	NED	George Boateng (Note: Boateng was born in Nkawkaw, Ghana, but also qualified to represent the Netherlands internationally and represented them at U-21 level before making his international debut for the Netherlands in November 2001.) (to Middlesbrough)
10	FW	ENG	Paul Merson (to Portsmouth)

No.	Pos.	Nation	Player
18	MF	ENG	Steve Stone (to Portsmouth)
23	MF	ENG	Michael Boulding (to Grimsby Town)

Transferred in

Date	Pos	Player	From	Fee
14 May 2002	GK	(Netherlands) Stefan Postma	(Netherlands) De Graafschap	£1,500,000
18 May 2002	CF	(Sweden) Marcus Allbäck	(Netherlands) Heerenveen	£2,000,000
8 July 2002	CF	Michael Boulding	Grimsby Town	Free transfer
26 July 2002	RB	(Ecuador) Ulises de la Cruz	(Scotland) Hibernian	£1,000,000
23 August 2002	CM	(Republic of Ireland) Mark Kinsella	Charlton Athletic	£1,000,000
29 August 2002	CB	(Norway) Ronny Johnsen	Manchester United	Free transfer
30 August 2002	AM	(Norway) Øyvind Leonhardsen	Tottenham Hotspur	Free transfer
				£5,500,000

Loaned in

Date	Pos	Player	From	Loan End
20 January 2003	CM	(Iceland) Joey Guðjónsson	Real Betis	31 May 2003

Transferred out

Date	Pos	Player	To	Fee
1 July 2002	GK	(Denmark) Peter Schmeichel	Manchester City	Free transfer
5 August 2002	DM	(Netherlands) George Boateng	Middlesbrough	£5,000,000
6 August 2002	AM	Paul Merson	Portsmouth	Free transfer
20 December 2002	RM	Steve Stone	Portsmouth	Free transfer
10 January 2003	CF	Michael Boulding	Grimsby Town	Free transfer
				£5,000,000

Loaned out

Date	Pos	Player	To	Loan End
26 July 2002	CM	(Northern Ireland) Gavin Melaugh	Rochdale	31 May 2003
9 August 2002	GK	(Wales) Boaz Myhill	Bristol City	5 November 2002
27 September 2002	CF	Michael Boulding	Sheffield United	1 November 2002
21 November 2002	GK	(Wales) Boaz Myhill	Bradford City	1 January 2003
29 November 2002	CM	(Republic of Ireland) John McGrath	Dagenham & Redbridge	31 May 2003
10 January 2003	CF	Michael Boulding	Grimsby Town	12 February 2003

Overall transfer activity

Expenditure
▼£5,500,000

Income
▲£5,000,000

Balance
▼£500,000

=== Statistics ===
Appearances and goals

As of end of season

No.	Pos	Nat	Player	Total		Premier League		FA Cup		League Cup		Intertoto Cup	
No.	Pos	Nat	Player	Apps	Goals	Apps	Goals	Apps	Goals	Apps	Goals	Apps	Goals
Goalkeepers
1	GK	(Finland) FIN	Peter Enckelman	39	0	33	0	0	0	3	0	3	0
13	GK	(Netherlands) NED	Stefan Postma	9	0	5+1	0	1	0	1	0	1	0
Defenders
2	DF	(Wales) WAL	Mark Delaney	17	0	12	0	0	0	1	0	4	0
3	DF	(England) ENG	Alan Wright	12	0	9+1	0	1	0	0	0	1	0
4	DF	(Sweden) SWE	Olof Mellberg	44	1	38	1	1	0	2	0	3	0
5	DF	(Turkey) TUR	Alpay Özalan	5	0	5	0	0	0	0	0	0	0
11	DF	(Republic of Ireland) IRL	Steve Staunton	32	1	22+4	0	0	0	3	0	3	1
15	DF	(Ecuador) ECU	Ulises de la Cruz	24	2	12+8	1	1	0	2+1	1	0	0
21	DF	(England) ENG	Jlloyd Samuel	45	0	33+5	0	1	0	4	0	2	0
24	DF	(England) ENG	Liam Ridgewell	1	0	0	0	0+1	0	0	0	0	0
27	DF	(Norway) NOR	Ronny Johnsen	30	0	25+1	0	0	0	4	0	0	0
30	DF	(Wales) WAL	Rob Edwards	9	0	7+1	0	1	0	0	0	0	0
Midfielders
6	MF	(England) ENG	Gareth Barry	44	4	35	3	1	0	4	1	4	0
7	MF	(England) ENG	Ian Taylor	19	2	9+4	0	0+1	0	2	1	3	1
12	MF	(Germany) GER	Thomas Hitzlsperger	33	4	24+2	2	0	0	2+1	2	4	0
17	MF	(England) ENG	Lee Hendrie	34	4	22+5	4	1	0	3	0	1+2	0
20	MF	(Morocco) MAR	Mustapha Hadji	14	0	7+4	0	0	0	0	0	1+2	0
22	MF	(Morocco) MAR	Hassan Kachloul	1	0	0	0	0	0	0	0	0+1	0
26	MF	(Republic of Ireland) IRL	Mark Kinsella	24	0	15+4	0	1	0	2+2	0	0	0
28	MF	(Norway) NOR	Øyvind Leonhardsen	23	3	13+6	3	0	0	3+1	0	0	0
29	MF	(England) ENG	Peter Whittingham	4	0	1+3	0	0	0	0	0	0	0
31	MF	(England) ENG	Stephen Cooke	3	0	0+3	0	0	0	0	0	0	0
33	MF	(Iceland) ISL	Joey Guðjónsson	11	2	9+2	2	0	0	0	0	0	0
Forwards
8	FW	(Colombia) COL	Juan Pablo Ángel	19	3	8+7	1	1	1	0+3	1	0	0
9	FW	(England) ENG	Dion Dublin	35	14	23+5	10	1	0	4	4	2	0
10	FW	(England) ENG	Darius Vassell	39	11	28+5	8	0+1	0	3	3	1+1	0
14	FW	(Sweden) SWE	Marcus Allbäck	25	6	9+11	5	0	0	0+2	0	3	1
16	FW	(England) ENG	Peter Crouch	18	0	7+7	0	0	0	0	0	4	0
25	FW	(England) ENG	Stefan Moore	17	1	7+6	1	0	0	1+1	0	0+2	0
Players transferred out during the season
6	MF	(Netherlands) NED	George Boateng	1	0	0	0	0	0	0	0	1	0
10	MF	(England) ENG	Paul Merson	1	0	0	0	0	0	0	0	0+1	0
18	MF	(England) ENG	Steve Stone	2	0	0	0	0	0	0	0	1+1	0
23	FW	(England) ENG	Michael Boulding	2	1	0	0	0	0	0	0	2	1

Last updated: 30 May 2003
Source: Competitions

Starting 11

No.	Pos.	Nat.	Name	MS	Notes
1	GK	(Finland)	Peter Enckelman	39	
2	RB	(Wales)	Mark Delaney	17	
27	CB	(Norway)	Ronny Johnsen	29	
4	CB	(Sweden)	Olof Mellberg	44	
21	LB	(England)	Jlloyd Samuel	40	
26	RM	(Republic of Ireland)	Mark Kinsella	18	Steve Staunton has 28 starts
17	CM	(England)	Lee Hendrie	27	
6	CM	(England)	Gareth Barry	44	
12	LM	(Germany)	Thomas Hitzlsperger	30	
9	CF	(England)	Dion Dublin	30	
10	CF	(England)	Darius Vassell	32	

== Youth & Reserves ==
The following players made most of their appearances for the reserves this season, but may have also appeared for the reserves or the U-17s, or may have appeared for the first team in a friendly.

Note: Flags indicate national team as defined under FIFA eligibility rules; some limited exceptions apply. Players may hold more than one non-FIFA nationality.

No.	Pos.	Nation	Player
37	GK	ENG	Boaz Myhill (Note: Myhill was born in Modesto, California, United States, but was raised in England from the age of 1, qualifying to represent any of the home nations. He represented England at U-17, U-18, and U-20 level before making his international debut for Wales in March 2008.)
38	MF	IRL	John McGrath
40	MF	IRL	Keith Fahey
—	DF	ENG	Leon Hylton

No.	Pos.	Nation	Player
—	DF	ENG	Danny Jackman
—	MF	NIR	Gavin Melaugh
—	FW	ENG	Jon Bewers
—			Seyi Morgan

U-19 squad

The following players made most of their appearances for the U-19s this season, but may have also appeared for the reserves or the U-17s.

Note: Flags indicate national team as defined under FIFA eligibility rules; some limited exceptions apply. Players may hold more than one non-FIFA nationality.

No.	Pos.	Nation	Player
39	GK	IRL	Wayne Henderson
42	FW	IRL	Peter Hynes
—	GK	ENG	Antoni Pecora
—	GK	IRL	Stephen Gahan
—	DF	ENG	Scott Cormell
—	DF	ENG	James O'Connor
—	DF	ENG	Cameron Stuart
—	DF	ENG	Oliver Williams
—	DF	IRL	Pierre Ennis
—	MF	ENG	Ryan Amoo

No.	Pos.	Nation	Player
—	MF	ENG	Adam Baptist (on trial to Stoke City)
—	MF	SCO	Colin Marshall
—	MF	NIR	Steven Davis
—	MF	NIR	Jamie Ward (Note: Ward was born in Birmingham, England, but also qualifies to represent Northern Ireland internationally through his grandfather and represented them at U-19 and U-21 level before making his international debut for Northern Ireland in August 2011.)
—	FW	ENG	Mark Atkinson
—	FW	ENG	Michael Husbands
—	FW	SCO	Alan Brazil
—	FW	FIN	Mika Aaritalo
—	MF		David Nolan

U-17 squad

The following players made most of their appearances for the U-17s this season, but may have also appeared for the reserves or the U-19s.

Note: Flags indicate national team as defined under FIFA eligibility rules; some limited exceptions apply. Players may hold more than one non-FIFA nationality.

No.	Pos.	Nation	Player
32	FW	ENG	Luke Moore
—	GK	ENG	Andrew Yarnold
—	DF	ENG	Stuart Bridges
—	DF	ENG	Gary Cahill
—	DF	ENG	Ashley Edkins
—	DF	ENG	Lee Grant
—	DF	ENG	Nick Green
—	DF	ENG	Paul Green
—	DF	IRL	Kevin Mulcahy
—	MF	ENG	Craig Gardner

No.	Pos.	Nation	Player
—	MF	ENG	Kyle Nix (Note: Nix was born in Sydney, Australia, but was raised in England and represented England at U-16, U-18, U-20, and C level.)
—	MF	ENG	Sam Williams
—	MF	IRL	Stephen Foley-Sheridan
—	FW	ENG	Gabriel Agbonlahor
—	FW	ENG	Shane Paul
—	FW	CIV	Amadou Koman
—	MF		Rowan Caney
—	MF		John Grady
—			Daniel Bridges

Other players

The following players did not play for any Aston Villa team this season.

Note: Flags indicate national team as defined under FIFA eligibility rules; some limited exceptions apply. Players may hold more than one non-FIFA nationality.

No.	Pos.	Nation	Player
—	GK	FIN	Jon Masalin
—	GK	TTO	Kelvin Jack (on trial from San Juan Jabloteh)
—	DF	ENG	Danny Haynes
—	DF	FIN	Lasse Lagerblom (on trial from Lahti)
—	MF	ENG	Michael Noakes
—	MF	ENG	Isaiah Osbourne
—	MF	ENG	Jay Smith (to Southend United)
—	MF	BEL	Christian Tshimanga Kabeya (Note: Kabeya was born in Kinshasa, Zaire (now the Democratic Republic of the Congo), but also qualifies to represent Belgium internationally and has represented them at U-16, U-17, U-18 and U-19 level.)

No.	Pos.	Nation	Player
—	MF	NOR	Espen Sögård (on trial from Lillestrøm SK)
—	FW	ENG	Matt Lewis (on trial from Kidderminster Harriers)
—	FW	ENG	Lee McGuire (to Bristol City)
—	MF	NIR	David Scullion
—	GK		Jake Meredith
—	MF		John Malpass (to Stourport Swifts)
—			Steve Jones (on trial to Stoke City)
