= Ulises de la Cruz =

Ecuadorian footballer (born 1974)

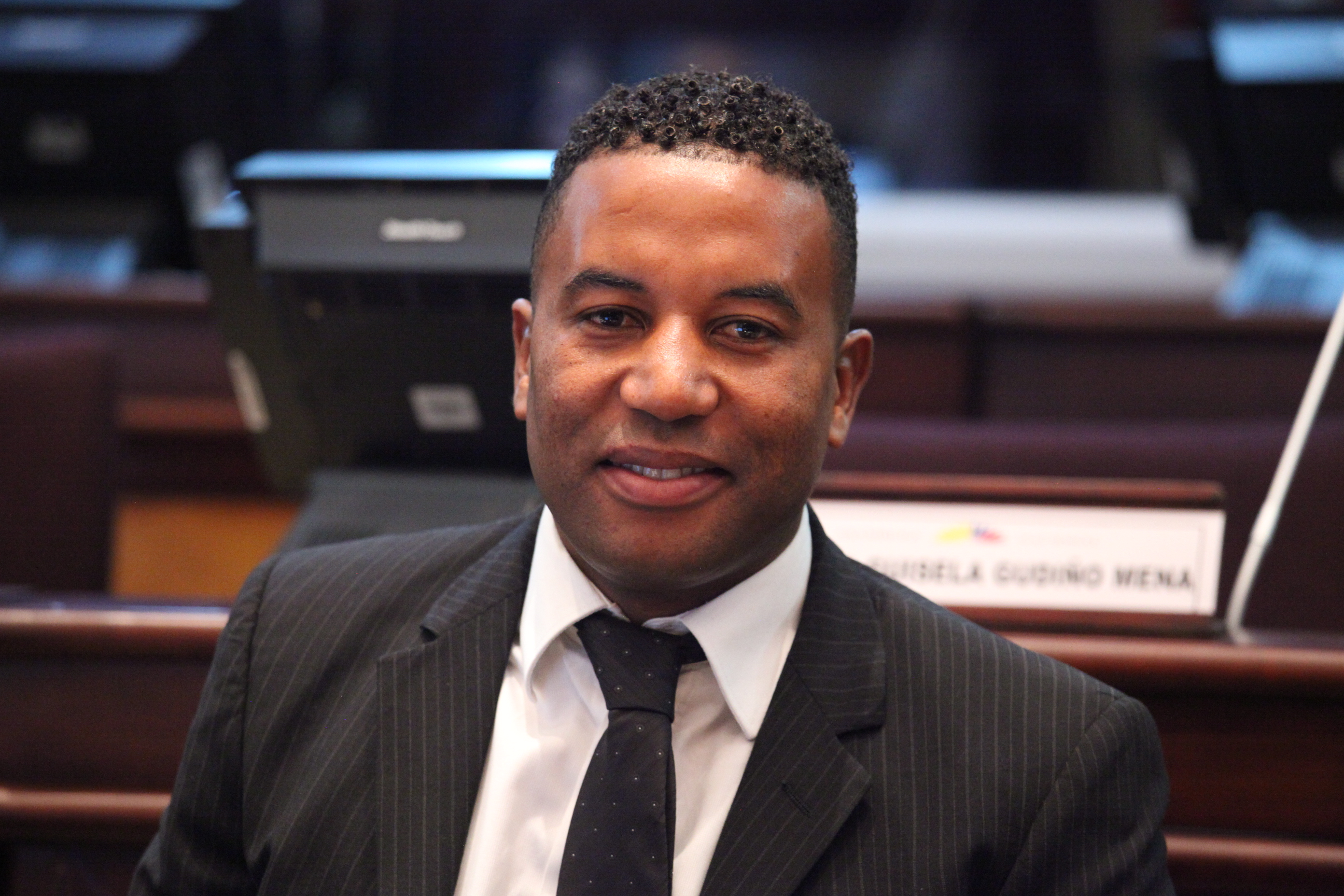

Member of the National Assembly for Carchi Province
- In office 14 May 2013 – 14 May 2017

Personal details
- Born: 8 February 1974 (age 52) Piquiucho, Carchi, Ecuador
- Party: PAIS Alliance
- Occupation: Footballer (retired); politician
Association football career
- Height: 1.76 m (5 ft 9 in)
- Position: Defender
Senior career*
| Years | Team | Apps | (Gls) |
| 1991–1994 | Deportivo Quito | 86 | (6) |
| 1995–1997 | Barcelona S.C. | 14 | (0) |
| 1996 | → Aucas (loan) | 32 | (3) |
| 1997 | → LDU Quito (loan) | 38 | (4) |
| 1998–2001 | LDU Quito | 91 | (16) |
| 1999 | → Cruzeiro (loan) | 4 | (0) |
| 2001 | → Barcelona S.C. (loan) | 8 | (0) |
| 2001–2002 | Hibernian | 32 | (2) |
| 2002–2006 | Aston Villa | 89 | (1) |
| 2006–2008 | Reading | 15 | (1) |
| 2009 | Birmingham City | 1 | (0) |
| 2009–2012 | LDU Quito | 117 | (14) |
| Total | | 527 | (47) |
International career
| 1995–2010 | Ecuador | 101 | (6) |
- * Club domestic league appearances and goals

Ulises Hernán de la Cruz Bernardo (born 8 February 1974) is an Ecuadorian former footballer, who since 2013 has been a member of his country's National Assembly for the governing Mover.

A defender, he played 101 times for the Ecuador national team between 1995 and 2010, and was selected for two FIFA World Cup tournaments. He spent his club career at Deportivo Quito, Barcelona S.C., Aucas, Cruzeiro, Hibernian, Aston Villa, Reading and Birmingham City.

De la Cruz has set up a charity, Friends of FundeCruz, in his home village to fund a number of projects serving the local community.

== Club career ==
=== Early career ===
De la Cruz was born in Piquiucho, Carchi. His first team was the Ecuadorian side Deportivo Quito, for whom he started playing at the age of 16 in the junior division, and later the professional division. Nonetheless, De la Cruz's breakthrough season was with LDU Quito in 1998. He scored three goals in the final against Emelec (7–0).

=== Hibernian ===
Alex McLeish, the manager of Scottish Premier League club Hibernian, watched de la Cruz play in international matches for Ecuador, and then signed him in June 2001 for a club record fee of £700,000. De la Cruz scored two goals for Hibs, both coming in an Edinburgh derby match against Hibs' local rivals Hearts. He only played for Hibs in one season, before he was sold after McLeish and Franck Sauzée both left and de la Cruz played in the 2002 FIFA World Cup. De la Cruz said before the tournament that he wanted to use the World Cup as a showcase, desiring a move to Spain or Italy.

=== Aston Villa ===
The 28-year-old de la Cruz was signed by Graham Taylor for Aston Villa ahead of the 2002–03 season. He previously made hints of leaving the club, feeling that joining Aston Villa is one of the highlights of his career. LDU Quito claimed that Hibernian failed to pay them a sell-on fee, but this was settled by agreement. Having made his debut, De la Cruz expressed his delight, playing in the Premier League and soon became a fan favourite at Aston Villa.

In his first season at the club, he played 24 times, scoring one league goal against Charlton Athletic. He featured more in the 2003–04 season after David O'Leary took over, and an injury to Mark Delaney ensured that de la Cruz could start more games than he had previously; he signed a new contract for the 2004–05 campaign.

During the 2005-06 season with Aston Villa, de la Cruz became frustrated at his lack of first team opportunities and accused O'Leary of blocking transfers for him.

=== Reading ===
On 25 August 2006, he signed a one-year deal with Reading on a free transfer. De la Cruz scored his first Reading goal against Sheffield United in a 3–1 win on 20 January 2007. After an impressive first season with Reading, he was offered a contract that would tie him to the Madejski Stadium for two more years. Following their relegation from the Premier League, Reading announced on 16 May 2008 that he would not be offered a new contract.

=== Birmingham City ===
After a few weeks' training with the club, de la Cruz signed a one-month contract with Birmingham City of the Football League Championship in March 2009. The player was initially given squad number 27, previously allocated to Krystian Pearce who had been loaned out for the season; however, the Football League ruled that the number could not be re-used and de la Cruz was given number 36 instead. He made his Birmingham debut as a second-half substitute in the 2–0 win away at Doncaster Rovers on 14 March. When his contract expired, the player chose not to accept the offer of an extension until the end of the season.

=== LDU Quito ===
Following his release, de la Cruz returned to Ecuador to play for FIFA Club World Cup runner-up LDU Quito, his third spell at the club. De la Cruz played in both 2009 Recopa Sudamericana matches against Internacional. LDU Quito won the Recopa, giving De la Cruz his first international title.

=== Retirement ===
In February 2013, de la Cruz announced he would retire from football and devote his time to politics in Ecuador. De la Cruz was given a farewell match.

== International career ==
Although not always a first choice for his club, De la Cruz remained an important member of the Ecuador national team. The 21 year-old debuted in May 1995 winning 101 caps for his country until his last match in May 2010 aged 36. He was a fixture in the Ecuadorian team at the 2006 FIFA World Cup, which reached the second round.

In his homeland, de la Cruz is one of Ecuador's most popular players, both for his footballing talent and his charitable projects. The Supporters' Trust at Reading (STAR) organised a facility to allow supporters the means to donate to the Ulises de la Cruz Foundation.

Due to Ecuador's poor start in the 2010 World Cup qualifiers, de la Cruz and his teammate, Ivan Hurtado sharply criticised the coach and the atmosphere in the team. As a result, they were excluded from selection for the last two matches of 2007 against Paraguay and Peru.

== Charitable work ==
Born in Piquiucho, a small village in the Valle del Chota, one of Ecuador's poorest regions, De la Cruz set up the charity Friends of FundeCruz to fund a number of projects serving the local community, to which he donates about 10% of his salary. Friends of FundeCruz is also a British registered charity. At one of the Reading matches, fans were asked to donate money to his fund and he raised a few thousand pounds. Money would also be raised at the Ruta del Sol in February 2008. The foundation funds amongst other things a water treatment plant, a health centre and a sports ground. De la Cruz has been named a UNICEF ambassador.

== Political career ==
In the Ecuadorian general election of 2013, De la Cruz was chosen as member of the National Assembly for Carchi Province. De la Cruz serves as member of PAIS Alliance. Agustín Delgado and Iván Hurtado, former team-mates of De la Cruz for the national team, also serve for the PAIS Alliance in the National Assembly.

== Honors ==
LDU Quito

- Serie A: 1998, 1999, 2010
- Recopa Sudamericana: 2009, 2010
- Copa Sudamericana: 2009

Ecuador

- Canada Cup: 1999

== See also ==
- List of men's footballers with 100 or more international caps
