= Ronny Johnsen =

Norwegian footballer (born 1969)

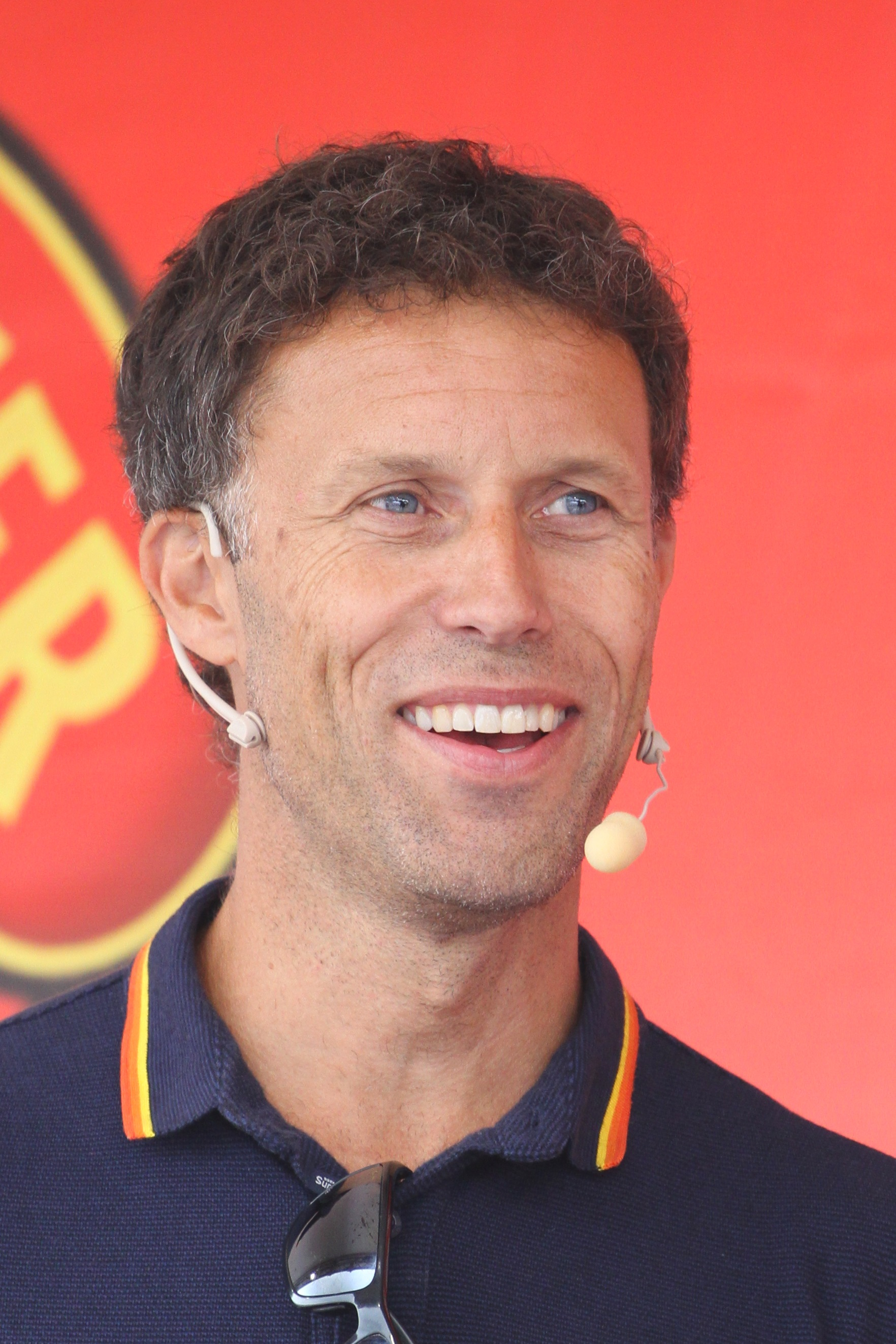
- Johnsen in 2017

Personal information
- Full name: Jean Ronny Johnsen
- Date of birth: 10 June 1969 (age 57)
- Place of birth: Sandefjord, Norway
- Height: 1.90 m (6 ft 3 in)
- Positions: Centre-back; defensive midfielder

Youth career
- Sem
- Stokke

Senior career*
Years	Team	Apps	(Gls)
1987–1991	Eik-Tønsberg	98	(24)
1992–1994	Lyn	38	(8)
1994–1995	Lillestrøm	23	(4)
1995–1996	Beşiktaş	22	(1)
1996–2002	Manchester United	99	(7)
2002–2004	Aston Villa	49	(1)
2004–2005	Newcastle United	3	(0)
2005–2008	Vålerenga	59	(6)
Total		384	(50)

International career
1991–2007	Norway	62	(3)

Managerial career
- 2020–2021: Eik Tønsberg
- 2023–: Norway U23 women (assistant)
- 2025–: Norway U18 men
- * Club domestic league appearances and goals

Jean Ronny Johnsen (born 10 June 1969) is a Norwegian former footballer who played as a centre-back or defensive midfielder. He played club football in Norway, Turkey, and England for Sem, Stokke, Eik-Tønsberg, Lyn, Lillestrøm, Beşiktaş, Manchester United, Aston Villa, Newcastle United and Vålerenga.

Johnsen was part of the Manchester United team that won the Treble of the Premier League, FA Cup and UEFA Champions League in 1999. He won an additional two Premier League titles and two FA Charity Shields with United, as well as the Norwegian league title with Vålerenga.

Johnsen was capped 62 times for Norway. He represented his country at the 1998 FIFA World Cup.

== Club career ==
Born in Sandefjord, Johnsen grew up in Stokke where he played for the local sides Sem IF and Stokke IL during his youth. He started his senior career as a striker in the second tier side Eik-Tønsberg in 1987, but was retrained as a centre-back by head coach Nils Johan Semb. Johnsen wanted to play as a striker and after he transferred to Lyn ahead of the 1992 season he played as a striker for the club in Tippeligaen. Halfway through the 1994 season, Johnsen transferred to Lillestrøm, where he was used more as a centre-back than a striker, before he moved to Beşiktaş in 1995. After a half season in Turkey, Johnsen was approached by Manchester United manager, Alex Ferguson who wanted to sign him. Johnsen turned down the first offer, but transferred to Manchester United during the summer of 1996, and signed a five-year contract with the club. With a fee of £1.2million, Johnsen became the then most expensive Norwegian defender.

While at Manchester United, he won 4 league titles (1997, 1999, 2000, and 2001), and one FA Cup in 1999 with the club. He was also a part of the team that won the UEFA Champions League in 1999. He covered the central midfield position in Manchester United's away win over Juventus in the semi-final. He also played the whole of the final in Barcelona, this time in defence, alongside Jaap Stam. He has the rare distinction of also winning four medals in four consecutive appearances with the club. He was on the pitch for the title clincher, FA Cup final, and Champions League final in 1999, and because of injury, the 2000 league title clincher against Tottenham Hotspur. Although he fell well short of the 10 appearances required for a title winner's medal in 2000, he received a title winner's medal through special dispensation – similar to the one credited to Dion Dublin for the same reason seven years earlier. The following season, he just met the criteria for a title medal.

While at Manchester United, he scored eight goals in all competitions – the first coming against Chelsea in the FA Charity Shield in August 1997. He remained with them until his contract expired at the end of the 2001–02 season, when he was given a free transfer.

In 2002, Johnsen and fellow Norwegian international Øyvind Leonhardsen had a trial at German side Schalke 04. After that move fell through, 33-year-old Johnsen signed with Aston Villa. In two years at Aston Villa, he scored once in the league, against Leeds United in February 2004. After leaving Aston Villa, Johnsen was offered a trial at Southampton and played against Chievo Verona in a friendly, ultimately he could not agree terms with the club. Johnsen then signed for Newcastle United but only played a handful of games before being released with concerns over his fitness levels.

In February 2005, Johnsen announced his retirement from professional football. Shortly afterwards he changed his mind, signing a one-year contract with the Norwegian club Vålerenga. Subsequently, he renewed this contract three times for the following 2006, 2007 and 2008 seasons.

Johnsen retired as an active football player on 3 November 2008, with Vålerenga losing their final game of the 2008 season 1–0 to SK Brann.

== International career ==
Johnsen did not represent Norway at youth level; but while Johnsen was playing for Eik at the second tier, national team coach Egil Olsen, because of a recommendation from Nils Johan Semb, included Johnsen in his squad without having seen him play. Johnsen made his debut for the Norwegian national team in a friendly match against Sweden in 1991. He played as winger, striker and midfielder during his early career at the national team, before he was used primarily as a centre-back. Johnsen played some of the matches in the qualification for the 1994 FIFA World Cup, and played as a striker when Norway won 3–0 away against Poland in 1993 and qualified for the World Cup, but was left out of the squad that travelled to the United States. Four years later, Johnsen was first choice at centre-back, and played all four matches in the 1998 FIFA World Cup. Johnsen played 61 matches for Norway, until May 2004 when he played against Wales. Three years later, he made a comeback for the national team, and played the whole match home against Argentina, which was Johnsen's last match at international level. He was 38 years and 73 days when he was last capped, making him the second-oldest player for the Norwegian national team, only beaten by Gunnar Thoresen.

== Career statistics ==
Club	Season	League	League		National Cup^{1}		League Cup		Continental^{2}		Other^{3}		Total	
Club	Season	League	Apps	Goals	Apps	Goals	Apps	Goals	Apps	Goals	Apps	Goals	Apps	Goals
Lyn	1992	Tippeligaen	12	1	3	3	—		—		—		15	4
Lyn	1993	Tippeligaen	19	4	0	0	—		—		—		19	4
Lyn	1994	First Division	7	3	2	1	—		—		—		9	4
Lyn	Total		38	8	5	4	—		—		—		43	12
Lillestrøm	1994	Tippeligaen	10	3			—		4	0	—		14	3
Lillestrøm	1995	Tippeligaen	13	1			—		—		—		13	1
Lillestrøm	Total		23	4			—		4	0	—		27	4
Beşiktaş	1995–96	1.Lig	22	1			—		2	0	—		24	1
Manchester United	1996–97	Premier League	31	0	2	0	0	0	9	0	0	0	42	0
Manchester United	1997–98	Premier League	22	2	3	1	1	0	5	0	1	1	32	4
Manchester United	1998–99	Premier League	22	3	5	0	1	0	8	0	1	0	37	3
Manchester United	1999–2000	Premier League	3	0	0	0	0	0	0	0	0	0	3	0
Manchester United	2000–01	Premier League	11	1	0	0	1	0	4	0	1	0	17	1
Manchester United	2001–02	Premier League	10	1	0	0	0	0	9	0	0	0	19	1
Manchester United	Total		99	7	10	1	3	0	35	0	3	1	150	9
Aston Villa	2002–03	Premier League	26	0	0	0	3	0	0	0	—		29	0
Aston Villa	2003–04	Premier League	23	1	1	0	3	0	—		—		27	1
Aston Villa	Total		49	1	1	0	6	0	0	0	—		56	1
Newcastle United	2004–05	Premier League	3	0	0	0	2	0	0	0	—		5	0
Vålerenga	2005	Tippeligaen	23	1	3	0	—		0	0	—		26	1
Vålerenga	2006	Tippeligaen	19	3	0	0	—		0	0	—		19	3
Vålerenga	2007	Tippeligaen	17	2	0	0	—		2	0	—		19	2
Vålerenga	2008	Tippeligaen	6	0	0	0	—		—		—		6	0
Vålerenga	Total		65	6	3	0	—		2	0	—		70	6
Career total			299	27	19	5	11	0	43	0	3	0	375	32

^{1} Includes FA Cup, Norwegian Football Cup and Turkish Cup.

^{2} Includes Champions League and UEFA Cup.

^{3} Includes FA Community Shield and Turkish Super Cup

== Honours ==
Manchester United

- Premier League: 1996–97, 1998–99, 2000–01
- FA Cup: 1998–99
- FA Charity Shield: 1996, 1997
- UEFA Champions League: 1998–99

Vålerenga

- Tippeligaen: 2005
- Norwegian Football Cup: 2008

Individual

- Kniksen Awards: Kniksen's honour award in 2008
