= Darius Vassell =

English footballer (born 1980)

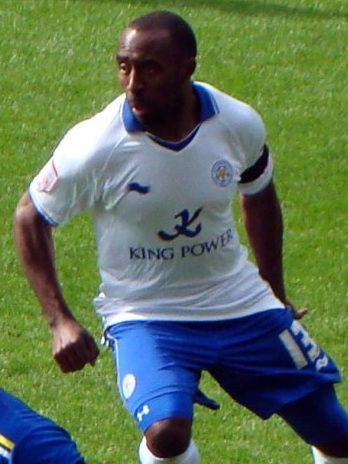
- Vassell playing for Leicester City in 2011

Personal information
- Full name: Darius Martin Clarke Vassell
- Date of birth: 13 June 1980 (age 46)
- Place of birth: Birmingham, England
- Height: 5 ft 7 in (1.70 m)
- Positions: Striker; winger

Youth career
- Romulus
- 1996–1998: Aston Villa

Senior career*
Years	Team	Apps	(Gls)
1998–2005	Aston Villa	162	(35)
2005–2009	Manchester City	103	(17)
2009–2010	Ankaragücü	22	(4)
2010–2012	Leicester City	44	(6)
Total		331	(62)

International career
1998–1999	England U18	5	(0)
1999–2001	England U21	11	(1)
2002–2004	England	22	(6)
- * Club domestic league appearances and goals

Darius Martin Clarke Vassell (born 13 June 1980) is an English former professional footballer who played as a forward for Aston Villa, Manchester City, Ankaragücü and Leicester City.

Vassell began his career at his home town club Aston Villa in the Premier League, being developed by their academy and making his first team debut in 1998. He was sold for £2 million in 2005 to another Premier League club, Manchester City, staying for four seasons before being released in 2009, moving abroad to Turkey for a season to play for the Süper Lig team Ankaragücü. In October 2010 he was brought back to England by his former international manager Sven-Göran Eriksson to play for the Championship side Leicester City.

Under Eriksson with England, Vassell scored six goals from 22 international caps awarded between 2002 and 2004, including appearances at the 2002 FIFA World Cup in South Korea and Japan, and UEFA Euro 2004 in Portugal.

== Club career ==
=== Early career ===
Vassell was born in Birmingham, West Midlands. He was raised in the Gravelly Hill area of Birmingham and went to the Yenton Primary School in Erdington and John Willmott School, in Falcon Lodge, Sutton Coldfield. He first played football with local junior team Romulus in the Birmingham Boys League scoring a record of 46 in a season and 6 in 1 match. Following this he signed for the Aston Villa youth team.

=== Aston Villa ===
An Aston Villa fan, Vassell was taken on by the club's School of Excellence. While playing for the club's youth team Vassell set a club record by scoring 39 goals in a single season. He made his first team debut as a substitute in a 3–1 win against Middlesbrough in August 1998.

Vassell's best qualities were his speed and agility. Aston Villa fans lamented the fact that his best performances seem to come with England, where he has proved particularly useful as a "super sub", coming on for the last 15 to 20 minutes of a game to trouble a tired defence with his exceptional pace. One oddity of his career was that he had never finished on the losing side in a league game in which he had scored. This run ended on 22 April 2011 when he scored for Leicester City during the 3–2 defeat to Nottingham Forest.

=== Manchester City ===
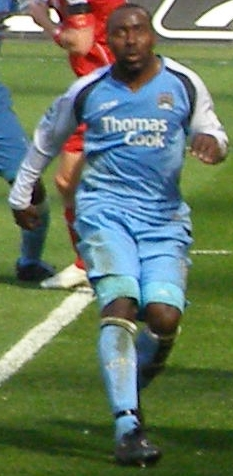
Vassell playing for Manchester City (2007)

Vassell was transferred to Manchester City in July 2005 for £2 million. During his first season for Manchester City, Vassell scored eight league goals in 35 appearances, forming an effective partnership with Andy Cole. Additionally, he helped the Blues to an FA Cup Quarter Final, scoring two goals in his five cup games. He played part of the season with a hernia problem, which required surgery in the close season.

In the 2007–08 season, he was assigned the number 12, as teammate Elano took the number 11 shirt. He generally struggled to find his best form. In the latter half of the season, many of his appearances were as a wide midfielder, as manager Sven-Göran Eriksson adopted a defensive 4–5–1 formation. Vassell was linked with a move away from Eastlands, with Turkish runners-up Besiktas having a £1m bid rejected and linked to other clubs, including Premier League rivals Bolton Wanderers and newly promoted Derby County. Vassell scored his 50th Premier League goal on 10 February 2008, in the victory against local rivals Manchester United. Vassell only played 15 games in 2008–09 and was released at the end of the season as his contract expired.

=== Ankaragücü ===
In July 2009 Vassell signed for the Turkish side Ankaragücü. Around 3,000 fans turned out and celebrated his arrival. He scored his first goal in the Turkish Süper Lig against Manisaspor in the second week of the season. He parted company with the club at the end of the 2009–10 season.

=== Leicester City ===
On 20 October 2010, Vassell signed for English side Leicester City on a two-year deal until the end of 2011–12 season, reuniting him with his former Manchester City and England manager Eriksson. He scored his first goal for Leicester in a 5–1 win over Doncaster Rovers on 11 December.

On 29 October 2011, he suffered a serious knee injury in a game against West Ham United which ruled him out for the rest of the season. The injury was a ruptured anterior cruciate ligament. Vassell left the club on 30 June after not being offered a new contract.

Vassell remained without a club until his retirement on 28 January 2016, at the age of 35.

== International career ==
Vassell made his England debut on 13 February 2002, in a man of the match performance against Netherlands in a 1–1 draw. Fellow debutants in this game were Michael Ricketts and Wayne Bridge. He scored in the game with a 60th-minute bicycle kick to equalise. He was subsequently included in England's 2002 World Cup campaign. He played in three games, starting just one: against Sweden in England's opening group game.

Vassell missed in the penalty shoot-out in the quarter-finals of Euro 2004 against hosts Portugal. Coming on for the injured Wayne Rooney early on in the game, he missed England's last spot-kick in the penalty shoot-out, allowing Portugal goalkeeper Ricardo to knock England out of the tournament by scoring the final penalty. Vassell did not play for England again.

== Coaching career ==
As of August 2024, Vassell was working with the England U18 squad.

== Personal life ==
Vassell was born to Jamaican parents and is a practising Christian. He credits his faith for his survival of a serious car accident. He is married to Amani Rodriquez-Thomas, they have a daughter named Persia; Vassell's 2017 autobiography Road to Persia was titled for her. He is also a cousin of Kilmarnock F.C. forward Kyle Vassell and former Cardiff City F.C. forward Isaac Vassell

== Career statistics ==
=== Club ===
Appearances and goals by club, season and competition
Season	Club	League			National cup (Note: Includes FA Cup, Turkish Cup)		League cup (Note: Includes Football League Cup)		Europe		Total	
Season	Club	Division	Apps	Goals	Apps	Goals	Apps	Goals	Apps	Goals	Apps	Goals
Aston Villa	1997–98	Premier League	0	0	0	0	0	0	0	0	0	0
Aston Villa	1998–99	Premier League	6	0	1	0	1	0	3 (Note: Appearances in UEFA Cup)	2	11	2
Aston Villa	1999–2000	Premier League	11	0	1	0	5	0	—		17	0
Aston Villa	2000–01	Premier League	23	4	3	1	1	0	3 (Note: Appearances in UEFA Intertoto Cup)	0	30	5
Aston Villa	2001–02	Premier League	36	12	1	0	1	0	6 (Note: Five appearances and two goals in UEFA Intertoto Cup, one in UEFA Cup)	2	44	14
Aston Villa	2002–03	Premier League	33	8	1	0	3	3	2	0	39	11
Aston Villa	2003–04	Premier League	32	9	1	0	6	1	—		39	10
Aston Villa	2004–05	Premier League	21	2	0	0	1	1	—		22	3
Aston Villa	Total		162	35	8	1	18	5	14	4	202	45
Manchester City	2005–06	Premier League	36	8	4	1	1	1	—		41	10
Manchester City	2006–07	Premier League	32	3	4	2	0	0	—		36	5
Manchester City	2007–08	Premier League	27	6	3	0	2	0	—		32	6
Manchester City	2008–09	Premier League	8	0	1	0	0	0	6	1	15	1
Manchester City	Total		103	17	12	3	3	1	6	1	124	22
Ankaragücü	2009–10	Süper Lig	22	4	3	0	—		—		25	4
Leicester City	2010–11	Championship	31	4	1	0	0	0	—		32	4
Leicester City	2011–12	Championship	13	2	0	0	0	0	—		13	2
Leicester City	Total		44	6	1	0	0	0	—		45	6
Career total			331	62	24	4	21	6	20	5	396	77

=== International ===
Appearances and goals by national team and year
National team	Year	Apps	Goals
England	2002	9	3
England	2003	6	1
England	2004	7	2
Total		22	6

Scores and results list England's goal tally first, score column indicates score after each Vassell goal.

List of international goals scored by Darius Vassell
No.	Date	Venue	Cap	Opponent	Score	Result	Competition
1	13 February 2002	Johan Cruyff Arena, Amsterdam, Netherlands	1	Netherlands	1–1	1–1	Friendly
2	17 April 2002	Anfield, Liverpool, England	3	Paraguay	3–0	4–0	Friendly
3	26 May 2002	Noevir Stadium Kobe, Hyōgo-ku, Kobe, Japan	5	Cameroon	1–1	2–2	Friendly
4	2 April 2003	Stadium of Light, Sunderland, England	11	Turkey	1–0	2–0	UEFA Euro 2004 qualifying
5	5 June 2004	City of Manchester Stadium, Manchester, England	18	Iceland	4–1	6–1	Friendly
6	5 June 2004	City of Manchester Stadium, Manchester, England	18	Iceland	6–1	6–1	Friendly

== Honours ==
Aston Villa

- UEFA Intertoto Cup: 2001
- FA Cup runner-up: 1999–2000
