= Stefan Postma =

Dutch former footballer (born 1976)

Personal information
- Full name: Stefan Postma
- Date of birth: 6 October 1976 (age 50)
- Place of birth: Utrecht, Netherlands
- Height: 2.01 m (6 ft 7 in)
- Position: Goalkeeper

Team information
- Current team: AGOVV Apeldoorn (Goalkeeping coach)

Senior career*
Years	Team	Apps	(Gls)
1995–2000	Utrecht	33	(0)
2000–2002	De Graafschap	67	(0)
2002–2006	Aston Villa	13	(0)
2005–2006	→ Wolverhampton Wanderers (loan)	12	(0)
2006	Wolverhampton Wanderers	17	(0)
2006–2008	ADO Den Haag	28	(0)
2008	De Graafschap	0	(0)
2009	Ermis Aradippou	4	(0)
2009–2011	AGOVV Apeldoorn	65	(0)
Total		239	(0)
- * Club domestic league appearances and goals as of 00:52, 3 September 2011 (UTC)

Stefan Postma (born 6 October 1976) is a Dutch former footballer who played as a goalkeeper. He is currently a goalkeeping coach at his last club, AGOVV Apeldoorn.

== Club career ==
=== Early career ===
Postma started his professional career at Utrecht before moving to De Graafschap.

=== Aston Villa ===
Postma was signed by Aston Villa on 14 May 2002 for 1.5 million pounds, upon Peter Schmeichel's transfer to Manchester City. Postma's debut came as a substitute in a 0–1 defeat against Southampton on 21 October, following the dismissal of Peter Enckelman.

After newly appointed Villa manager David O'Leary purchased Danish keeper Thomas Sørensen, Postma became the club's second choice goalkeeper at the club. He made two appearances in the 2003–04 season and three in 2004–05.

=== Wolves ===
Towards the end of his time at Villa, Postma was linked with transfers to several European clubs before going on loan to Wolverhampton Wanderers at the start of the 2005–06 season. In January 2006, he signed a contract to remain at Wolves until the end of the season. It was announced on 5 May that year that he would leave Wolves in the summer, and he returned to the Eredivisie with ADO Den Haag.

=== Later career ===
In August 2008, Postma rejoined former club De Graafschap on a six-month contract.

== Personal life ==
In 2006, Postma became embroiled in a sex scandal when his ex-girlfriend posted a pornographic video featuring his partner penetrating him with a strapon on YouTube. The Mirror reported that Postma had "originally managed to keep the video secret by buying it when his ex tried to sell it on eBay."
