= Jon Masalin =

Finnish footballer and coach (born 1986)

Personal information
- Full name: Jon Henrik Masalin
- Date of birth: 29 January 1986 (age 40)
- Place of birth: Helsinki, Finland
- Height: 1.96 m (6 ft 5 in)
- Position: Goalkeeper

Team information
- Current team: Fredrikstad (goalkeeper coach)

Youth career
- 2003: Heerenveen
- 2003–2005: Aston Villa

Senior career*
Years	Team	Apps	(Gls)
2002–2003	Jokerit	1	(0)
2005	Hämeenlinna	11	(0)
2006–2007	Notodden	28	(0)
2008–2009	HamKam	23	(0)
2010–2017	Fredrikstad	93	(0)
Total		144	(0)

International career
2007–2009	Finland U21	1	(0)

Managerial career
- 2018–: Fredrikstad (goalkeeper coach)
- * Club domestic league appearances and goals

Jon Masalin (born 29 January 1986) is a retired Finnish football goalkeeper. He is currently working as a goalkeeper coach at Fredrikstad FK.

He was on spells with Aston Villa and SC Heerenveen, and has later played for Norwegian clubs Notodden and HamKam, before he joined Fredrikstad in 2010.

== Career statistics ==
Club	Season	Division	League		Cup		Total	
Club	Season	Division	Apps	Goals	Apps	Goals	Apps	Goals
Jokerit	2002	Ykkönen	1	0	0	0	1	0
Hämeenlinna	2005	Ykkönen	11	0	0	0	11	0
Notodden	2006	2. divisjon	1	0	–		1	0
Notodden	2007	1. divisjon	25	1	0	0	25	1
Notodden	Total		26	1	0	0	26	1
HamKam	2008	Tippeligaen	15	0	2	0	17	0
HamKam	2009	1. divisjon	8	0	0	0	8	0
HamKam	Total		23	0	2	0	25	0
Fredrikstad	2010	1. divisjon	10	0	0	0	10	0
Fredrikstad	2011	Tippeligaen	7	0	5	0	12	0
Fredrikstad	2012	Tippeligaen	14	0	2	0	16	0
Fredrikstad	2013	1. divisjon	17	0	0	0	17	0
Fredrikstad	2014	1. divisjon	29	0	1	0	30	0
Fredrikstad	2015	1. divisjon	10	0	0	0	10	0
Fredrikstad	2016	1. divisjon	0	0	0	0	0	0
Fredrikstad	2017	1. divisjon	2	0	0	0	2	0
Fredrikstad	Total		89	0	8	0	97	0
Fredrikstad 2	2012	3. divisjon	7	0	–		7	0
Fredrikstad 2	2016	3. divisjon	9	0	–		9	0
Fredrikstad 2	Total		16	0	0	0	16	0
Career Total			166	1	10	0	176	1
