= Lee Grant (footballer, born 1985) =

English footballer (born 1985)

Personal information
- Full name: Lee Mark Grant
- Date of birth: 31 December 1985 (age 40)
- Place of birth: York, England
- Height: 6 ft 2 in (1.88 m)
- Positions: Defender; midfielder

Senior career*
Years	Team	Apps	(Gls)
2002	York City	1	(0)
2002–2005	Aston Villa	0	(0)
2004–2005	→ York City (loan)	8	(2)
2006	Southport	0	(0)
Total		9	(2)
- * Club domestic league appearances and goals as of 21:22, 8 April 2009 (UTC)

Lee Mark Grant (born 31 December 1985) is an English former footballer who played as a defender. He played for York City, Aston Villa and Southport.

== Career ==
Born in York, Grant started his career with hometown club York City as an apprentice and made his first team debut after coming on as an 88th minute substitute in a 3–0 victory over Bristol Rovers. At the age of 16 years and 116 days, this appearance made him the second youngest player to feature for York. He was expected to start a three-year scholarship before joining FA Premier League team Aston Villa in July 2002, despite suggestions of him leaving York being refuted by assistant manager Adie Shaw.

He rejoined York on a month's loan in November 2004 and made his debut in a 1–0 defeat to Woking in the Conference National on 20 November. He opened the scoring in a 3–1 victory over Crawley Town on 18 December with a header on 40 minutes, which was followed with York's only goal in a 5–1 defeat at Scarborough. He finished his spell at the club with nine appearances. He was released from his Villa contract in 2005. Grant joined Conference side Southport in January 2006, but after only being able to make an appearance in the County Cup, he was released in February.
