= 1998–99 Aston Villa F.C. season =

English football club season

Aston Villa F.C.
1998–99 season
- Chairman: Doug Ellis
- Manager: John Gregory
- Stadium: Villa Park
- FA Premier League: 6th
- FA Cup: Fourth round
- League Cup: Third round
- UEFA Cup: Second round
- Top goalscorer: League: Julian Joachim (14); All: Julian Joachim (16)
- Average home league attendance: 36,937

The 1998–99 English football season was Aston Villa's 7th season in the Premier League, and their eleventh consecutive season in the top division of English football.

This would be manager John Gregory's first full season. The early-season sale of Dwight Yorke to Manchester United seemed to rule out Villa's chances of challenging for a place in Europe, but new signings Dion Dublin and Paul Merson soon revitalised the attack and the team spent much of the first half of the season at the top of the Premier League.

Eventually, the challenge from Manchester United, Arsenal and Chelsea proved to be too strong, and Villa's season capitulated. The team finally finished sixth below West Ham United, thus missed out on a European place.

Kit Supplier	Sponsor
<< Reebok >>	LDV Vans

== Premier League ==
Pos	Team	Pld	W	D	L	GF	GA	GD	Pts	Qualification or relegation
4	Leeds United	38	18	13	7	62	34	+28	67	Qualification for the UEFA Cup first round
5	West Ham United	38	16	9	13	46	53	−7	57	Qualification for the Intertoto Cup third round
6	Aston Villa	38	15	10	13	51	46	+5	55	
7	Liverpool	38	15	9	14	68	49	+19	54	
8	Derby County	38	13	13	12	40	45	−5	52	

Source: Premier League
Rules for classification: 1) points; 2) goal difference; 3) number of goals scored.

Results summary

Overall								Home						Away					
Pld	W	D	L	GF	GA	GD	Pts	W	D	L	GF	GA	GD	W	D	L	GF	GA	GD
38	15	10	13	51	46	+5	55	10	3	6	33	28	+5	5	7	7	18	18	0

Source: 1998-99 FA Premier League table

Matches

15 Aug 1998 1	Everton	0–0	Aston Villa	Goodison Park
		Report
Note: Alan Thompson made his debut.

23 Aug 1998 2	Aston Villa	3–1	Middlesbrough	Villa Park
	Joachim 6’, Charles 52’, Thompson 78’	Report

29 Aug 1998 3	Sheffield Wednesday	0–1	Aston Villa	Hillsborough Stadium
		Report	Joachim 37’

9 Sep 1998 4	Aston Villa	1–0	Newcastle United	Villa Park
	Hendrie (pen.) 63’	Report

12 Sep 1998 5	Aston Villa	2–0	Wimbledon	Villa Park
	Merson 45’, Taylor 59’	Report
Note: Paul Merson made his debut.

19 Sep 1998 6	Leeds United	0–0	Aston Villa	Elland Road
		Report

26 Sep 1998 7	Aston Villa	1–0	Derby County	Villa Park
	Merson 14’	Report

3 Oct 1998 8	Coventry City	1–2	Aston Villa	Highfield Road
		Report	Taylor 29’, 39’

17 Oct 1998 9	West Ham United	0–0	Aston Villa	Boleyn Ground
		Report

24 Oct 1998 10	Aston Villa	1–1	Leicester City	Villa Park
	Ehiogu 67’	Report

7 Nov 1998 11	Aston Villa	3–2	Tottenham Hotspur	Villa Park
	Dublin 31’, 35’, Collymore 48’	Report

14 Nov 1998 12	Southampton	1–4	Aston Villa	The Dell
		Report	Dublin 3’, 56’, 85’, Merson 77’

21 Nov 1998 13	Aston Villa	2–4	Liverpool	Villa Park
	Dublin 47’, 64’	Report
Note: The grudge from last season's fixture continued when Stan Collymore was given a yellow card for going in with a two-footed challenge on Steve Harkness's standing leg in the ninth minute of the match, causing him to be substituted with ligament damage.

28 Nov 1998 14	Nottingham Forest	2–2	Aston Villa	City Ground
		Report	Joachim 59’, 63’

5 Dec 1998 15	Aston Villa	1–1	Manchester United	Villa Park
	Joachim 55’	Report

9 Dec 1998 16	Chelsea	2–1	Aston Villa	Stamford Bridge
		Report	Hendrie 32’

13 Dec 1998 17	Aston Villa	3–2	Arsenal	Villa Park
	Joachim 62’, Dublin 65’, 83’	Report

21 Dec 1998 18	Charlton Athletic	0–1	Aston Villa	The Valley
		Report	Rufus (og) 3’

26 Dec 1998 19	Blackburn Rovers	2–1	Aston Villa	Ewood Park
		Report	Scimeca 81’

28 Dec 1998 20	Aston Villa	2–1	Sheffield Wednesday	Villa Park
	Southgate 7’, Ehiogu 85’	Report

9 Jan 1999 21	Aston Villa	0–0	Middlesbrough	Villa Park
		Report

18 Jan 1999 22	Aston Villa	3–0	Everton	Villa Park
	Joachim 40’, 51’, Merson 78’	Report

30 Jan 1999 23	Newcastle United	2–1	Aston Villa	St James' Park
		Report	Merson 60’

6 Feb 1999 24	Aston Villa	1–3	Blackburn Rovers	Villa Park
	Joachim 69’	Report

17 Feb 1999 25	Aston Villa	1–2	Leeds United	Villa Park
	Scimeca 76’	Report

21 Feb 1999 26	Wimbledon	0–0	Aston Villa	Selhurst Park
		Report

27 Feb 1999 27	Aston Villa	1–4	Coventry City	Villa Park
	Dublin (pen.) 55’	Report

10 Mar 1999 28	Derby County	2–1	Aston Villa	Pride Park Stadium
		Report	Thompson 44’

13 Mar 1999 29	Tottenham Hotspur	1–0	Aston Villa	White Hart Lane
		Report

21 Mar 1999 30	Aston Villa	0–3	Chelsea	Villa Park
		Report

2 Apr 1999 31	Aston Villa	0–0	West Ham United	Villa Park
		Report

6 Apr 1999 32	Leicester City	2–2	Aston Villa	Walkers Stadium
		Report	Hendrie 2’, Joachim 49’

10 Apr 1999 33	Aston Villa	3–0	Southampton	Villa Park
	Draper 13’, Joachim 66’, Dublin 89’	Report

17 Apr 1999 34	Liverpool	0–1	Aston Villa	Anfield
		Report	Taylor 52’

24 Apr 1999 35	Aston Villa	2–0	Nottingham Forest	Villa Park
	Draper 45’, Barry 57’	Report

1 May 1999 36	Manchester United	2–1	Aston Villa	Old Trafford
		Report	Joachim 33’

8 May 1999 37	Aston Villa	3–4	Charlton Athletic	Villa Park
	Barry 7’, Joachim 66’, 79’	Report

16 May 1999 38	Arsenal	1–0	Aston Villa	Highbury
		Report

Aston Villa's results

Results by matchday

Match	1	2	3	4	5	6	7	8	9	10	11	12	13	14	15	16	17	18	19	20	21	22	23	24	25	26	27	28	29	30	31	32	33	34	35	36	37	38
Ground	A	H	A	H	H	A	H	A	A	H	H	A	H	A	H	A	H	A	A	H	A	H	A	H	H	A	H	A	A	H	H	A	H	A	H	A	H	A
Result	D	W	W	W	W	D	W	W	D	D	W	W	L	D	D	L	W	W	L	W	D	W	L	L	L	D	L	L	L	L	D	D	W	W	W	L	L	L
Position	6	3	1	2	1	1	1	1	1	1	1	1	1	1	1	1	1	1	2	1	2	2	2	4	4	4	4	5	5	6	6	6	5	5	5	5	5	6

Source: 11v11.com: 1998-99 Aston Villa results
A = Away; H = Home; W = Win; D = Draw; L = Loss

== FA Cup ==
2 January 1999 R3	Aston Villa	3-0	Hull City	Birmingham
15:00	Collymore 45' 67'; Joachim 61'	Report		Stadium: Villa Park; Attendance: 39,217; Referee: Scott Mathieson

22 January 1999 R4	Aston Villa	0-2	Fulham	Birmingham
15:00		Report	Morgan 8'; Hayward 43'	Stadium: Villa Park; Attendance: 35,260; Referee: David Elleray

== League Cup ==
28 October 1998 R3	Chelsea	4-1	Aston Villa	London
19:45	Vialli 32' 67' 85'; Flo 71'	Report	Draper 10'	Stadium: Stamford Bridge; Attendance: 26,790; Referee: Graham Barber

== UEFA Cup ==
15 September 1998 R1 L1	Aston Villa (England)	3-2	(Norway) Strømsgodset	Birmingham
19:45	Charles 83'; Vassell 89' 90'	Report	Michelsen 21'; George 23'	Stadium: Villa Park; Attendance: 28,893; Referee: Hartmut Strampe

29 September 1998 R1 L2	Strømsgodset (Norway)	0-3 (2-6 agg.)	(England) Aston Villa	Drammen
18:00		Report	Collymore 10' 23' 64'	Stadium: Marienlyst Stadion; Attendance: 5,500; Referee: Dieter Schoch

20 October 1998 R2 L1	Celta Vigo (Spain)	0-1	(England) Aston Villa	Vigo
21:15		Report	Joachim 15'	Stadium: Balaídos; Attendance: 25,000; Referee: Oğuz Sarvan

3 November 1998 R2 L2	Aston Villa (England)	1-3 (2-3 agg.)	(Spain) Celta Vigo	Birmingham
19:45	Collymore 30' (pen.)	Report	Sánchez 26'; Mostovoi 34'; Penev 48'	Stadium: Villa Park; Attendance: 29,910; Referee: Armand Ancion

== Players ==
Starting 11

Considering starts in all competitions

No.	Pos.	Nat.	Name	MS	Notes
13	GK	(England)	Michael Oakes	28	
6	RB	(England)	Steve Watson	29	
5	CB	(England)	Ugo Ehiogu	29	
4	CB	(England)	Gareth Southgate	44	
3	LB	(England)	Alan Wright	45	
10	RM	(England)	Paul Merson	22	Alan Thompson has 23 starts
17	CM	(England)	Lee Hendrie	36	
7	CM	(England)	Ian Taylor	35	
11	LM	(England)	Gareth Barry	32	
12	CF	(England)	Julian Joachim	36	
14	CF	(England)	Dion Dublin	24	

First-team squad

Squad at end of season

Note: Flags indicate national team as defined under FIFA eligibility rules; some limited exceptions apply. Players may hold more than one non-FIFA nationality.

No.	Pos.	Nation	Player
1	GK	AUS	Mark Bosnich
3	DF	ENG	Alan Wright
4	DF	ENG	Gareth Southgate
5	DF	ENG	Ugo Ehiogu
6	DF	ENG	Steve Watson
7	MF	ENG	Ian Taylor
8	MF	ENG	Mark Draper
9	FW	ENG	Stan Collymore
10	FW	ENG	Paul Merson
11	MF	ENG	Alan Thompson
12	FW	ENG	Julian Joachim
13	GK	ENG	Michael Oakes
14	FW	ENG	Dion Dublin

No.	Pos.	Nation	Player
15	DF	ENG	Gareth Barry
16	MF	ENG	Simon Grayson
17	MF	ENG	Lee Hendrie
18	MF	ITA	Fabio Ferraresi
20	MF	ENG	Riccardo Scimeca
21	FW	ENG	Darren Byfield (Note: Byfield was born in Sutton Coldfield, England, but also qualifies to represent Jamaica internationally and would make his international debut for Jamaica in 2003.)
22	FW	ENG	Darius Vassell
24	DF	WAL	Mark Delaney
26	MF	ENG	Steve Stone
28	DF	ENG	Tommy Jaszczun
30	GK	ENG	Adam Rachel
32	DF	ENG	Aaron Lescott
34	DF	SCO	Colin Calderwood

#	Name	Position	Nationality	Place of birth	Date of birth (age)	Signed from	Date signed	Fee	Apps	Gls
Goalkeepers
1	Mark Bosnich	GK	(Australia)	Liverpool	13 January 1972 (aged 26)	(Australia) Sydney Croatia	28 February 1992	Free transfer	211	0
13	Michael Oakes	GK	(England)	Northwich	30 October 1973 (aged 24)	Academy	1 July 1991	—N/a	33	0
30	Adam Rachel	GK	(England)	Birmingham	30 December 1976 (aged 21)	Academy	1 July 1995	—N/a	0	0
39	Peter Enckelman	GK	(Finland)	Turku	10 March 1977 (aged 21)	(Finland) TPS	1 February 1999	£200,000	-	-
40	Matthew Ghent	GK	(England)	Burton upon Trent	5 September 1980 (aged 17)	Academy	1 July 1997	—N/a	0	0
Defenders
2	Gary Charles	RB	(England)	Newham	13 April 1970 (aged 28)	Derby County	6 January 1995	£1,450,000	88	2
3	Alan Wright	LB	(England)	Ashton-under-Lyne	28 September 1971 (aged 26)	Blackburn Rovers	10 March 1995	£1,000,000	154	3
4	Gareth Southgate (c)	CB	(England)	Watford	3 September 1970 (aged 27)	Crystal Palace	1 July 1995	£3,500,000	120	3
5	Ugo Ehiogu	CB	(England)	Hackney	3 November 1972 (aged 25)	West Bromwich Albion	12 July 1991	£40,000	224	12
6	Steve Watson	RB	(England)	North Shields	1 April 1974 (aged 24)	Newcastle United	15 October 1998	£4,000,000	-	-
15	Gareth Barry	LB	(England)	Hastings	23 February 1981 (aged 17)	Academy	1 January 1998	—N/a	2	0
16	Simon Grayson	RB	(England)	Ripon	16 December 1969 (aged 28)	Leicester City	26 June 1997	£1,300,000	44	2
20	Riccardo Scimeca	CB	(England)	Leamington Spa	13 June 1975 (aged 23)	Academy	1 July 1995	—N/a	51	0
23	David Hughes	LB	(Wales)	Wrexham	1 February 1978 (aged 20)	Academy	1 July 1996	—N/a	7	0
24	Lee Collins	LB	(England)	Birmingham	10 September 1977 (aged 20)	Academy	1 July 1997	—N/a	0	0
24*	Mark Delaney	RB	(Wales)	Haverfordwest	13 May 1976 (aged 22)	(Wales) Cardiff City	9 March 1999	£250,000	-	-
26	Ben Petty	LB	(England)	Solihull	2 March 1977 (aged 21)	Academy	1 July 1998	—N/a	-	-
28	Tommy Jaszczun	CB	(England)	Kettering	16 September 1977 (aged 20)	Academy	1 July 1998	—N/a	-	-
31	Jlloyd Samuel	LB	(Trinidad and Tobago)	San Fernando	29 March 1981 (aged 17)	Academy	1 January 1999	—N/a	-	-
32	Aaron Lescott	CB	(England)	Birmingham	2 December 1978 (aged 19)	Academy	1 July 1998	—N/a	-	-
34	Colin Calderwood	CB	(Scotland)	Stranraer	20 January 1965 (aged 33)	Tottenham Hotspur	23 March 1999	£230,000	-	-
Midfielders
7	Ian Taylor	CM	(England)	Birmingham	4 June 1968 (aged 30)	Sheffield Wednesday	21 December 1994	£1,000,000	140	18
8	Mark Draper	CM	(England)	Long Eaton	11 November 1970 (aged 27)	Leicester City	5 July 1995	£3,250,000	125	8
10*	Paul Merson	AM	(England)	Harlesden	20 March 1968 (aged 30)	Middlesbrough	8 September 1998	£6,750,000	-	-
11	Alan Thompson	LM	(England)	Newcastle upon Tyne	22 December 1973 (aged 24)	Bolton Wanderers	5 June 1998	£4,500,000	-	-
17	Lee Hendrie	RM	(England)	Solihull	18 May 1977 (aged 21)	Academy	1 July 1995	—N/a	34	3
18	Fabio Ferraresi	CM	(Italy)	Fano	24 May 1979 (aged 19)	(Italy) Cesena	24 June 1998	Free transfer	-	-
26*	Steve Stone	RM	(England)	Gateshead	20 August 1971 (aged 26)	Nottingham Forest	11 March 1999	£5,500,000	-	-
27	Michael Standing	AM	(England)	Shoreham-by-Sea	20 March 1981 (aged 17)	Academy	1 July 1998	—N/a	-	-
Forwards
9	Stan Collymore	CF	(England)	Tittensor	22 January 1971 (aged 27)	Liverpool	13 May 1997	£7,000,000	37	8
10	Dwight Yorke	CF	(Trinidad and Tobago)	Canaan	3 November 1971 (aged 26)	(Trinidad and Tobago) Signal Hill	19 July 1991	£120,000	277	98
12	Julian Joachim	CF	(England)	Peterborough	20 September 1974 (aged 23)	Leicester City	24 February 1996	£1,890,000	57	12
14	Dion Dublin	CF	(England)	Leicester	22 April 1969 (aged 29)	Coventry City	5 November 1998	£5,750,000	-	-
21	Darren Byfield	CF	(Jamaica)	(England) Sutton Coldfield	29 September 1976 (aged 21)	Academy	1 July 1997	—N/a	8	0
22	Darius Vassell	CF	(England)	Birmingham	13 June 1980 (aged 18)	Academy	1 January 1998	—N/a	0	0
25	Alan Lee	CF	(Republic of Ireland)	Galway	21 August 1978 (aged 19)	Academy	1 July 1998	—N/a	-	-
29	Richard Walker	CF	(England)	Bloxwich	8 November 1977 (aged 20)	Academy	1 July 1997	—N/a	1	0

*squad number was re-used following a players departure.
Note: Stats and ages are correct as of July 1, 1998.

=== Transfers ===
Left club during season
Note: Flags indicate national team as defined under FIFA eligibility rules; some limited exceptions apply. Players may hold more than one non-FIFA nationality.

No.	Pos.	Nation	Player
2	DF	ENG	Gary Charles (to Benfica)
6	DF	ENG	David Unsworth (to Everton)
10	FW	TTO	Dwight Yorke (to Manchester United)

No.	Pos.	Nation	Player
24	DF	ENG	Lee Collins (to Stoke City)
26	DF	ENG	Ben Petty (to Stoke City)

Transferred in

Date	Pos	Player	From	Fee
5 June 1998	LM	Alan Thompson	Bolton Wanderers	£4,500,000
24 June 1998	CM	(Italy) Fabio Ferraresi	(Italy) Cesena	Free transfer
24 June 1998	CB	David Unsworth	West Ham United	£3,000,000
8 September 1998	AM	Paul Merson	Middlesbrough	£6,750,000
15 October 1998	RB	Steve Watson	Newcastle United	£4,000,000
5 November 1998	CF	Dion Dublin	Coventry City	£5,750,000
1 February 1999	GK	(Finland) Peter Enckelman	(Finland) TPS	£200,000
9 March 1999	RB	(Wales) Mark Delaney	(Wales) Cardiff City	£250,000
11 March 1999	RM	Steve Stone	Nottingham Forest	£5,500,000
23 March 1999	CB	(Scotland) Colin Calderwood	Tottenham Hotspur	£230,000
28 April 1999	CF	(Scotland) Neil Tarrant	(Scotland) Ross County	£250,000
				£30,425,000

Loaned in

Date	Pos	Player	From	Loan End

Transferred out

Date	Pos	Player	To	Fee
1 July 1998	CF	Neil Davis	Walsall	Free transfer
1 July 1998	LB	(Republic of Ireland) Steve Staunton	Liverpool	Free transfer
1 July 1998	CF	(Federal Republic of Yugoslavia) Savo Milošević	(Spain) Real Zaragoza	£3,500,000
7 July 1998	RB	(Portugal) Fernando Nélson	(Portugal) Porto	£1,100,000
20 August 1998	CF	(Trinidad and Tobago) Dwight Yorke	Manchester United	£12,600,000
21 August 1998	CF	David Unsworth	Everton	£3,000,000
27 November 1998	CB	Ben Petty	Stoke City	£100,000
14 January 1999	RB	Gary Charles	(Portugal) Benfica	£1,000,000
14 January 1999	LB	Lee Collins	Stoke City	Free transfer
				£21,300,000

Record

Loaned out

Date	Pos	Player	To	Loan End
6 November 1998	CF	(Jamaica) Darren Byfield	Preston North End	9 January 1999
27 November 1998	CF	(Republic of Ireland) Alan Lee	Torquay United	27 January 1999
11 December 1998	CF	Richard Walker	Cambridge United	31 May 1999
2 March 1999	CF	(Republic of Ireland) Alan Lee	Port Vale	31 May 1999

Overall transfer activity

Expenditure ▼£30,425,000

Income ▲£21,300,000

Balance ▼£9,125,000

=== Statistics ===
Appearances and goals

No.	Pos	Nat	Player	Total		FA Premier League		FA Cup		League Cup		UEFA Cup	
No.	Pos	Nat	Player	Apps	Goals	Apps	Goals	Apps	Goals	Apps	Goals	Apps	Goals
Goalkeepers
1	GK	(Australia) AUS	Mark Bosnich	17	0	15	0	0	0	0	0	2	0
13	GK	(England) ENG	Michael Oakes	28	0	23	0	2	0	1	0	2	0
30	GK	(England) ENG	Adam Rachel	1	0	0+1	0	0	0	0	0	0	0
Defenders
3	DF	(England) ENG	Alan Wright	45	0	38	0	2	0	1	0	4	0
4	DF	(England) ENG	Gareth Southgate	44	1	38	1	2	0	0	0	4	0
5	DF	(England) ENG	Ugo Ehiogu	31	2	23+2	2	2	0	1	0	3	0
6	DF	(England) ENG	Steve Watson	30	0	26+1	0	2	0	1	0	0	0
15	DF	(England) ENG	Gareth Barry	37	2	27+5	2	2	0	0	0	3	0
16	DF	(England) ENG	Simon Grayson	20	0	4+11	0	0+1	0	1	0	2+1	0
24	DF	(Wales) WAL	Mark Delaney	2	0	0+2	0	0	0	0	0	0	0
28	DF	(England) ENG	Tommy Jaszczun	1	0	0	0	0	0	0+1	0	0	0
32	DF	(England) ENG	Aaron Lescott	1	0	0	0	0+1	0	0	0	0	0
34	DF	(Scotland) SCO	Colin Calderwood	8	0	8	0	0	0	0	0	0	0
Midfielders
7	MF	(England) ENG	Ian Taylor	38	4	31+2	4	1	0	1	0	2+1	0
8	MF	(England) ENG	Mark Draper	29	3	13+10	2	1	0	1	1	3+1	0
10	MF	(England) ENG	Paul Merson	28	5	21+5	5	1	0	1	0	0	0
11	MF	(England) ENG	Alan Thompson	29	2	20+5	2	0	0	0+1	0	3	0
17	MF	(England) ENG	Lee Hendrie	37	3	31+1	3	2	0	0	0	3	0
18	MF	(Italy) ITA	Fabio Ferraresi	1	0	0	0	0	0	0	0	0+1	0
20	MF	(England) ENG	Riccardo Scimeca	24	2	16+2	2	2	0	1	0	1+2	0
26	MF	(England) ENG	Steve Stone	10	0	9+1	0	0	0	0	0	0	0
Forwards
9	FW	(England) ENG	Stan Collymore	24	7	11+9	1	1	2	0	0	3	4
12	FW	(England) ENG	Julian Joachim	43	16	29+7	14	2	1	1	0	4	1
14	FW	(England) ENG	Dion Dublin	24	11	24	11	0	0	0	0	0	0
21	FW	(England) ENG	Darren Byfield	2	0	0	0	0	0	1	0	1	0
22	FW	(England) ENG	Darius Vassell	11	2	0+6	0	0+1	0	0+1	0	0+3	2
Players transferred out during the season
2	DF	(England) ENG	Gary Charles	17	2	10+1	1	0+1	0	1	0	4	1
10	FW	(Trinidad and Tobago) TTO	Dwight Yorke	1	0	1	0	0	0	0	0	0	0

Last updated: 15 May 1999
Source: Competitions

=== Goalscorers ===
Name	FA Premier League	FA Cup	League Cup	UEFA Cup	Total
(England) Julian Joachim	14	1		1	16
(England) Dion Dublin	11				11
(England) Stan Collymore	1	2		4	7
(England) Paul Merson	5				5
(England) Ian Taylor	4				4
(England) Lee Hendrie	3				3
(England) Mark Draper	2		1		3
(England) Gareth Barry	3				3
(England) Alan Thompson	2				2
(England) Ugo Ehiogu	2				2
(England) Riccardo Scimeca	2				2
(England) Darius Vassell				2	2
(England) Gary Charles	1			1	2
(England) Gareth Southgate	1				1
Opposition own goals	1				1
Total goals	52	3	1	8	64

== Youth & Reserves ==
Reserve squad

The following players did not appear for the first-team this season.

Note: Flags indicate national team as defined under FIFA eligibility rules; some limited exceptions apply. Players may hold more than one non-FIFA nationality.

No.	Pos.	Nation	Player
23	DF	WAL	David Hughes
25	FW	IRL	Alan Lee
29	FW	ENG	Richard Walker
31	DF	ENG	Jlloyd Samuel (Note: Samuel was born in San Fernando, Trinidad and Tobago, but also qualified to represent England internationally and would represent them at U-18, U-20, and U-21 level and be called up to the senior team before switching his international allegiance to Trinidad and Tobago and making his international debut for Trinidad and Tobago in September 2009.)
39	GK	FIN	Peter Enckelman

No.	Pos.	Nation	Player
—	DF	ENG	Reuben Hazell
—	MF	TTO	Russell Latapy (on trial from Boavista)
—	FW	ENG	Darren Middleton
—	FW	SCO	Neil Tarrant (Note: Tarrant was born in Darlington, England, but also qualified to represent Scotland internationally and represented them at U-21 level.)

Youth team

The following players spent most of the season playing for the U-17 and U-19 teams, but may have also appeared for the reserves.

Note: Flags indicate national team as defined under FIFA eligibility rules; some limited exceptions apply. Players may hold more than one non-FIFA nationality.

No.	Pos.	Nation	Player
27	FW	ENG	Michael Standing
40	GK	ENG	Matthew Ghent
—	GK	ENG	Boaz Myhill (Note: Myhill was born in Modesto, California, United States, but was raised in England from the age of 1, qualifying to represent any of the home nations. He represented England at U-17, and U-18, and U-20 level before making his international debut for Wales in March 2008.)
—	GK	WAL	Michael Price
—	DF	ENG	David Andrewartha
—	DF	ENG	Jonathan Bewers
—	DF	ENG	Michael Blackwood
—	DF	ENG	Calum Davenport
—	DF	ENG	Rob Edwards (Note: Edwards was born in Madeley, England, but also qualified to represent Wales internationally through his parents and would make his international debut for Wales in March 2003.)
—	DF	ENG	Liam Folds
—	DF	ENG	Danny Haynes
—	DF	ENG	Leon Hylton
—	DF	ENG	Danny Jackman
—	DF	ENG	Karl Johnson
—	DF	ENG	Jamie Kearns
—	DF	ENG	Liam Ridgewell
—	DF	ENG	Martin Ridley
—	DF	SCO	Gary McSeveney
—	MF	ENG	Ryan Amoo
—	MF	ENG	David Berks
—	MF	ENG	Jamie Edwards
—	MF	ENG	David Harding
—	MF	ENG	Adam Marsh
—	MF	ENG	Alexis Nicolas (Note: Nicolas was born in Westminster, England, but also qualified to represent Cyprus internationally and represented them at U-21 level.)
—	MF	ENG	Jamie Pawley
—	MF	ENG	Luke Prince
—	MF	ENG	Jay Smith
—	MF	ENG	Michael Standing
—	MF	ENG	Gregory Walters
—	MF	NIR	Gavin Melaugh

No.	Pos.	Nation	Player
—	MF	SWE	David Curtolo
—	MF	ENG	Steve Malone
—	FW	ENG	Mark DeBolla
—	FW	ENG	Stephen Evans
—	FW	ENG	Lee McGuire
—	FW	ENG	Andrew Marfell
—	FW	ENG	Stefan Moore
—	FW	ENG	Jamie Smith (on trial from Gloucester City)
—	FW	WAL	Graham Evans
—	FW	SCO	Brian Mulholland
—	FW	SWE	Michael Soraghan (Note: Soraghan was born in Greece, but also qualified to represent Sweden internationally and represented them at U-17 level.)
—	GK		Neil Barnes
—	DF		Wesley Meacham
—	DF		Andrew Wells
—	MF		Jamie Cunnington
—	MF		Craig McCarthy (on trial from Bashley)
—			Liam Bell
—			Matthew Brooker
—			Danny Cox
—			Gary Davies
—			Ben Jackson
—			Declan McArthy
—			Peter McConnell
—			Jonathan Rhule
—			Mark Richards
—			Matthew Roberts
—			Lawrence Shannon
—			Adam Smith
—			Dean Smith

Other players

The following players did not play for any Villa team this season.

Note: Flags indicate national team as defined under FIFA eligibility rules; some limited exceptions apply. Players may hold more than one non-FIFA nationality.

No.	Pos.	Nation	Player
—	GK	ENG	Nikki Bull
—	GK	USA	Marcus Hahnemann (on trial from Colorado Rapids)
—	DF	WAL	Stuart Thornley
—	DF	GER	Leslie Hines (to Kidderminster Harriers)
—	MF	ENG	Alex Meredith
—	MF	ENG	Nathan Pulisciano
—	MF	SWE	Kalle Lindgren (on trial from Landskrona BoIS)

No.	Pos.	Nation	Player
—	FW	ENG	Tom Poston (on trial to Norwich City)
—	FW	IND	Bhaichung Bhutia (on trial from East Bengal)
—	MF		Mark Rollins
—			Jordan Ryan
—			Abdul Sadique
—			Martin Tranter
