= 1997–98 Aston Villa F.C. season =

English football club season

Aston Villa F.C.
1997–98 season
- Chairman: Doug Ellis
- Manager: Brian Little (until 24 February); John Gregory (from 25 February)
- Stadium: Villa Park
- FA Premier League: 7th
- FA Cup: Fifth round
- League Cup: Third round
- UEFA Cup: Quarter-finals
- Top goalscorer: League: Dwight Yorke (12); All: Dwight Yorke (14)
- Average home league attendance: 36,137
Home colours	Away colours	Third colours

The 1997–98 English football season was Aston Villa's 6th season in the Premier League.

When Brian Little resigned as Aston Villa manager in February, Villa were 15th in the Premier League and were starting to look like outside bets for relegation. Ruud Gullit, recently sacked by Chelsea, was linked with the vacancy, but the surprise choice for the job was Wycombe manager John Gregory, a former Villa coach. He influenced a late run of form which saw Villa climb to seventh place, and for the second season running Villa qualified for the UEFA Cup via the UEFA Respect Fair Play ranking.

There were debut appearances for Gareth Barry (365), Simon Grayson (48), Stan Collymore (46), Darren Byfield (7), Richard Walker (6), Matthew Ghent, Paul Crichton and Lee Collins.

Kit Supplier	Sponsor
<< Reebok >>	AST Computer

== Premier League ==
Pos	Team	Pld	W	D	L	GF	GA	GD	Pts	Qualification or relegation
5	Leeds United	38	17	8	13	57	46	+11	59	Qualification for the UEFA Cup first round (Note: Aston Villa was rewarded entry to the UEFA Cup through UEFA Fair Play ranking.)
6	Blackburn Rovers	38	16	10	12	57	52	+5	58	Qualification for the UEFA Cup first round
7	Aston Villa	38	17	6	15	49	48	+1	57	Qualification for the UEFA Cup first round
8	West Ham United	38	16	8	14	56	57	−1	56	
9	Derby County	38	16	7	15	52	49	+3	55	

Source: Premier League
Rules for classification: 1) points; 2) goal difference; 3) number of goals scored.
Notes:

Matches

9 August 1997	Leicester City	1–0	Aston Villa
		Report		Attendance: 20,304
Note: 26-year-old Stan Collymore made his debut for his boyhood club.

13 August 1997	Aston Villa	0–4	Blackburn Rovers
		Report		Attendance: 37,112

23 August 1997	Newcastle United	1–0	Aston Villa
		Report		Attendance: 36,783

27 August 1997	Tottenham Hotspur	3–2	Aston Villa
		Report	Yorke 27', Collymore 58'	Attendance: 26,317
Note: Stan Collymore scored his first club goal.

30 August 1997	Aston Villa	1–0	Leeds United
	Yorke 67'	Report		Attendance: 39,027

13 September 1997	Barnsley	0–3	Aston Villa
		Report	Ehiogu 25', Draper 50', Taylor 72'	Attendance: 18,649

20 September 1997	Aston Villa	2–1	Derby County
	Yorke 72', Joachim 75'	Report		Attendance: 35,444

22 September 1997	Liverpool	3–0	Aston Villa
		Report		Attendance: 34,843

27 September 1997	Aston Villa	2–2	Sheffield Wednesday
	Staunton 32', Taylor 49'	Report		Attendance: 32,044

4 October 1997	Bolton Wanderers	0–1	Aston Villa
		Report	Milošević 12'	Attendance: 24,186
Note: Stan Collymore was sent off after getting into a fistfight with Bolton Wanderers' Andy Todd and subsequently handed a three match ban by the F.A.

18 October 1997	Aston Villa	1–2	Wimbledon
	Taylor 45'	Report		Attendance: 32,087

26 October 1997	Arsenal	0–0	Aston Villa
		Report		Attendance: 38,061

1 November 1997	Aston Villa	0–2	Chelsea
		Report		Attendance: 39,372

8 November 1997	Crystal Palace	1–1	Aston Villa
	Joachim 86'	Report		Attendance: 21,097

22 November 1997	Aston Villa	2–1	Everton
	Milošević 37', Ehiogu 56'	Report		Attendance: 36,389

29 November 1997	West Ham United	2–1	Aston Villa
		Report	Yorke 47'	Attendance: 24,976

6 December 1997	Aston Villa	3–0	Coventry City
	Collymore 21', Hendrie 71', Joachim 85'	Report		Attendance: 33,250

15 December 1997	Manchester United	1–0	Aston Villa
		Report		Attendance: 55,151

20 December 1997	Aston Villa	1–1	Southampton
	Taylor 64'	Report		Attendance: 29,343

26 December 1997	Aston Villa	4–1	Tottenham Hotspur
	Draper 38', 68', Collymore 81', 89'	Report		Attendance: 38,644

28 December 1997	Leeds United	1–1	Aston Villa
	Milošević 85'	Report		Attendance: 36,287

10 January 1998	Aston Villa	1–1	Leicester City
	Joachim 87'	Report		Attendance: 36,429

17 January 1998	Blackburn Rovers	5–0	Aston Villa
		Report		Attendance: 24,834

1 February 1998	Aston Villa	0–1	Newcastle United
		Report		Attendance: 38,266

7 February 1998	Derby County	0–1	Aston Villa
		Report	Yorke 90'	Attendance: 30,251

18 February 1998	Aston Villa	0–2	Manchester United
		Report		Attendance: 39,372

21 February 1998	Wimbledon	2–1	Aston Villa
		Report	Milošević 41'	Attendance: 13,131

28 February 1998	Aston Villa	2–1	Liverpool
	Collymore 10', 65'	Report		Attendance: 39,372
Note: During the match Stan Collymore accused former teammate Steve Harkness of racist abuse, an incident that was later picked up by the Professional Footballer's Association (PFA), but went unresolved and was closed after both players met in private and agreed to move on without charges.

8 March 1998	Chelsea	0–1	Aston Villa
		Report	Joachim 51'	Attendance: 33,018

11 March 1998	Aston Villa	0–1	Barnsley
		Report		Attendance: 29,519

14 March 1998	Aston Villa	3–1	Crystal Palace
	Taylor 1', Milošević (pen) 14', 35'	Report		Attendance: 33,781

28 March 1998	Everton	1–4	Aston Villa	Goodison Park
		Report	Joachim 12', Charles 62', Yorke (pen) 72', 81'	Attendance: 36,471
Note: Notable performances included Steve Staunton and Dwight Yorke who both made the Carling Premiership Team of the Week Staunton, on the left-side of a three-man defence, helped snuff out the opposition attack with seven tackles. He made 46 successful passes, nine over fifteen yards, to remain top of the Opta index table for defenders, ahead of Arsenal's Tony Adams and Liverpool's Stig Inge Bjørnebye.

4 April 1998	Aston Villa	2–0	West Ham United
	Joachim 76', Milošević 82'	Report		Attendance: 39,372

11 April 1998	Coventry City	1–2	Aston Villa
		Report	Yorke 5', 48'	Attendance: 22,792

18 April 1998	Southampton	1–2	Aston Villa
	Le Tissier	Report	Hendrie 6', Yorke 60'	Attendance: 15,238
Note: Despite Matt Le Tissier's stunning goal, Villa registered their sixth successive victory. Two Villa players made the Carling Opta Team of the Week: Dwight Yorke with four shots on target including the winning Goal. Alan Wright set up Yorke's winning goal and out-thought the Saints attack making two blocks, one clearance and stealing possession with six interceptions.

25 April 1998	Aston Villa	1–3	Bolton Wanderers
	Taylor 57'	Report		Attendance: 38,392

2 May 1998	Sheffield Wednesday	1–3	Aston Villa
		Report	Yorke 21', Hendrie 25', Joachim 50'	Attendance: 34,177

10 May 1998	Aston Villa	1–0	Arsenal
	Yorke 37' (pen)	Report		Attendance: 39,372

== FA Cup ==
3 January 1998 R3	Portsmouth	2-2	Aston Villa	Portsmouth
15:00	Foster 6' 40'	Report	Steve Staunton 41'; Simon Grayson 88'	Stadium: Fratton Park; Attendance: 16,013; Referee: Uriah Rennie

14 January 1998 R3R	Aston Villa	1-0	Portsmouth	Birmingham
19:45	Milošević 21'	Report		Stadium: Villa Park; Attendance: 23,355; Referee: Uriah Rennie

24 January 1998 R4	Aston Villa	4-0	West Bromwich Albion	Birmingham
15:00	Grayson 4'; Yorke 62' 64'; Collymore 72'	Report		Stadium: Villa Park; Attendance: 39,372; Referee: Neale Barry

14 February 1998 R5	Aston Villa	0-1	Coventry City	Birmingham
15:00		Report	Viorel Moldovan 72'	Stadium: Villa Park; Attendance: 36,979; Referee: Gary Willard

== League Cup ==
15 October 1997 R3	West Ham United	3-0	Aston Villa	London
19:45	Hartson 9' 81'; Lampard 17'	Report		Stadium: Boleyn Ground; Attendance: 20,360; Referee: Stephen Lodge

== UEFA Cup ==
16 September 1997 R1 L1	Bordeaux (France)	0-0	(England) Aston Villa	Bordeaux
20:30		Report		Stadium: Stade du Parc Lescure; Attendance: 16,800; Referee: Armand Ancion

30 September 1997 R1 L2	Aston Villa (England)	1-0 (a.e.t.) (1-0 agg.)	(France) Bordeaux	Birmingham
19:45	Milošević 111'}	Report		Stadium: Villa Park; Attendance: 33,072; Referee: Knud Erik Fisker

21 October 1997 R2 L1	Athletic Bilbao (Spain)	0-0	(England) Aston Villa	Bilbao
20:30		Report		Stadium: San Mamés; Attendance: 39,000; Referee: Hartmut Strampe

4 November 1997 R2 L2	Aston Villa (England)	2-1 (2-1 agg.)	(Spain) Athletic Bilbao	Birmingham
19:30	Taylor 27'; Yorke 50'	Report	González 70'	Stadium: Villa Park; Attendance: 35,915; Referee: Sándor Piller

25 November 1997 R3 L1	Steaua București (Romania)	2-1	(England) Aston Villa	Bucharest
19:45	Ciocoiu 30' 32'	Report	Yorke 54'	Stadium: Stadionul Steaua; Attendance: 24,000; Referee: Ľuboš Micheľ
Note: Villa brought with them several skips of aid for the Romanian orphanages.

9 December 1997 R3 L2	Aston Villa (England)	2-0 (3-2 agg.)	(Romania) Steaua București	Birmingham
19:45	Milošević 71' Taylor 85'	Report		Stadium: Villa Park; Attendance: 35,102; Referee: Bernd Heynemann

3 March 1998 QF L1	Atlético Madrid (Spain)	1-0	(England) Aston Villa	Madrid
21:30	Vieri 42' (pen.)	Report		Stadium: Estadio Vicente Calderón; Attendance: 51,000; Referee: Stefano Braschi

17 March 1998 QF L2	Aston Villa (England)	2-1 (2-2* agg.)	(Spain) Atlético Madrid	Birmingham
19:45	Taylor 72'; Collymore 74'	Report	Caminero 28'	Stadium: Villa Park; Attendance: 39,163; Referee: Mario van der Ende

== Players ==
The 55 players were supported by 180 permanent staff and supplemented by 850 part-timers.

#	Name	Position	Nationality	Place of birth	Date of birth (age)	Signed from	Date signed	Fee	Apps	Gls
Goalkeepers
1	Mark Bosnich	GK	(Australia)	Liverpool	13 January 1972 (aged 25)	(Australia) Sydney Croatia	28 February 1992	Free transfer	169	0
13	Michael Oakes	GK	(England)	Northwich	30 October 1973 (aged 23)	Academy	1 July 1991	—N/a	24	0
29	Paul Crichton	GK	(England)	Pontefract	3 October 1968 (aged 28)	West Bromwich Albion	7 August 1997	Loan	-	-
29*	Matthew Ghent	GK	(England)	Burton upon Trent	5 September 1980 (aged 16)	Academy	1 July 1997	—N/a	-	-
30	Adam Rachel	GK	(England)	Birmingham	30 December 1976 (aged 20)	Academy	1 July 1995	—N/a	0	0
31	Stuart Brock	GK	(England)	West Bromwich	26 September 1976 (aged 20)	Academy	1 July 1996	—N/a	0	0
Defenders
2	Gary Charles	RB	(England)	Newham	13 April 1970 (aged 27)	Derby County	6 January 1995	£1,450,000	63	1
3	Steve Staunton	LB	(Republic of Ireland)	Dundalk	19 January 1969 (aged 28)	Liverpool	7 August 1991	£1,100,000	225	15
4	Gareth Southgate (c)	CB	(England)	Watford	3 September 1970 (aged 26)	Crystal Palace	1 July 1995	£3,500,000	77	3
5	Ugo Ehiogu	CB	(England)	Hackney	3 November 1972 (aged 24)	West Bromwich Albion	12 July 1991	£40,000	176	10
14	Alan Wright	LB	(England)	Ashton-under-Lyne	28 September 1971 (aged 25)	Blackburn Rovers	10 March 1995	£1,000,000	104	3
15	Fernando Nélson	RB	(Portugal)	Porto	5 November 1971 (aged 25)	(Portugal) Sporting	2 August 1996	£1,700,000	39	0
16	Simon Grayson	RB	(England)	Ripon	16 December 1969 (aged 27)	Leicester City	26 June 1997	£1,300,000	-	-
19	David Hughes	LB	(Wales)	Wrexham	1 February 1978 (aged 19)	Academy	1 July 1996	—N/a	7	0
20	Riccardo Scimeca	CB	(England)	Leamington Spa	13 June 1975 (aged 22)	Academy	1 July 1995	—N/a	22	0
21	Lee Collins	LB	(England)	Birmingham	10 September 1977 (aged 19)	Academy	1 July 1997	—N/a	-	-
24*	Gareth Barry	LB	(England)	Hastings	23 February 1981 (aged 16)	Academy	1 January 1998	—N/a	-	-
Midfielders
6	Andy Townsend	CM	(Republic of Ireland)	(England) Maidstone	26 July 1963 (aged 33)	Chelsea	26 July 1993	£2,100,000	172	11
7	Ian Taylor	CM	(England)	Birmingham	4 June 1968 (aged 29)	Sheffield Wednesday	21 December 1994	£1,000,000	96	9
8	Mark Draper	CM	(England)	Long Eaton	11 November 1970 (aged 26)	Leicester City	5 July 1995	£3,250,000	82	5
17	Lee Hendrie	RM	(England)	Solihull	18 May 1977 (aged 20)	Academy	1 July 1995	—N/a	10	0
18	Saša Ćurčić	DM	(Federal Republic of Yugoslavia)	Belgrade	14 February 1972 (aged 25)	Bolton Wanderers	1 July 1995	£4.000.000	25	5
24	Scott Murray	RM	(Scotland)	Fraserburgh	26 May 1974 (aged 23)	Academy	1 July 1995	—N/a	4	0
Forwards
9	Savo Milošević	CF	(Federal Republic of Yugoslavia)	Bijeljina	2 September 1973 (aged 23)	(Federal Republic of Yugoslavia) Partizan	26 June 1995	£3,500,000	85	24
10	Dwight Yorke	CF	(Trinidad and Tobago)	Canaan	3 November 1971 (aged 25)	(Trinidad and Tobago) Signal Hill	19 July 1991	£120,000	237	82
11	Stan Collymore	CF	(England)	Tittensor	22 January 1971 (aged 26)	Liverpool	13 May 1997	£7,000,000	-	-
12	Julian Joachim	CF	(England)	Peterborough	20 September 1974 (aged 22)	Leicester City	24 February 1996	£1,890,000	28	4
22	Darius Vassell	CF	(England)	Birmingham	13 June 1980 (aged 17)	Academy	1 January 1998	—N/a	-	-
23	Neil Davis	CF	(England)	Bloxwich	15 August 1973 (aged 23)	Academy	1 July 1995	—N/a	3	0
25	Darren Byfield	CF	(Jamaica)	(England) Sutton Coldfield	29 September 1976 (aged 20)	Academy	1 July 1997	—N/a	-	-
27	Richard Walker	CF	(England)	Bloxwich	8 November 1977 (aged 19)	Academy	1 July 1997	—N/a	-	-

*squad number was re-used following a players departure.
Note: Stats and ages are correct as of July 1, 1997.

=== Transfers ===
Transferred in

Date	Pos	Player	From	Fee
13 May 1997	CF	Stan Collymore	Liverpool	£7,200,000
26 June 1997	RB	Simon Grayson	Leicester City	£1,300,000
27 November 1997	CM	(Sweden) David Curtolo	(Sweden) Västerås	£315,000
				£8,515,000

Record

Loaned in

Date	Pos	Player	From	Loan End
7 August 1997	GK	Paul Crichton	West Bromwich Albion	13 August 1997

Transferred out

Date	Pos	Player	To	Fee
1 July 1997	LM	(Republic of Ireland) Gareth Farrelly	Everton	£750,000
29 August 1997	CM	(Republic of Ireland) Andy Townsend	Middlesbrough	£500,000
1 September 1997	GK	Stuart Brock	Kidderminster	Free transfer
9 December 1997	RM	(Scotland) Scott Murray	Bristol City	£150,000
26 March 1998	DM	(Federal Republic of Yugoslavia) Saša Ćurčić	Crystal Palace	£1,000,000
				£2,400,000

Loaned out

Date	Pos	Player	To	Loan End
1 August 1997	CF	Neil Davis	Tranmere Rovers	23 August 1997
26 March 1998	LB	(Wales) David Hughes	Carlisle United	26 April 1998

Overall transfer activity

Expenditure
▼£8,330,000

Income
▲£2,400,000

Balance
▼£5,930,000
