= Ferraresi =

Ferraresi is an Italian surname. Notable people with the surname include:

- Aldo Ferraresi (1902–1978), Italian classical violinist
- Fabio Ferraresi (born 1979), Italian footballer
- Jorge Ferraresi (born 1961), Argentine politician and engineer
- Nahuel Ferraresi (born 1998), Argentine-Venezuelan footballer
