= Stan Collymore =

English footballer (born 1971)

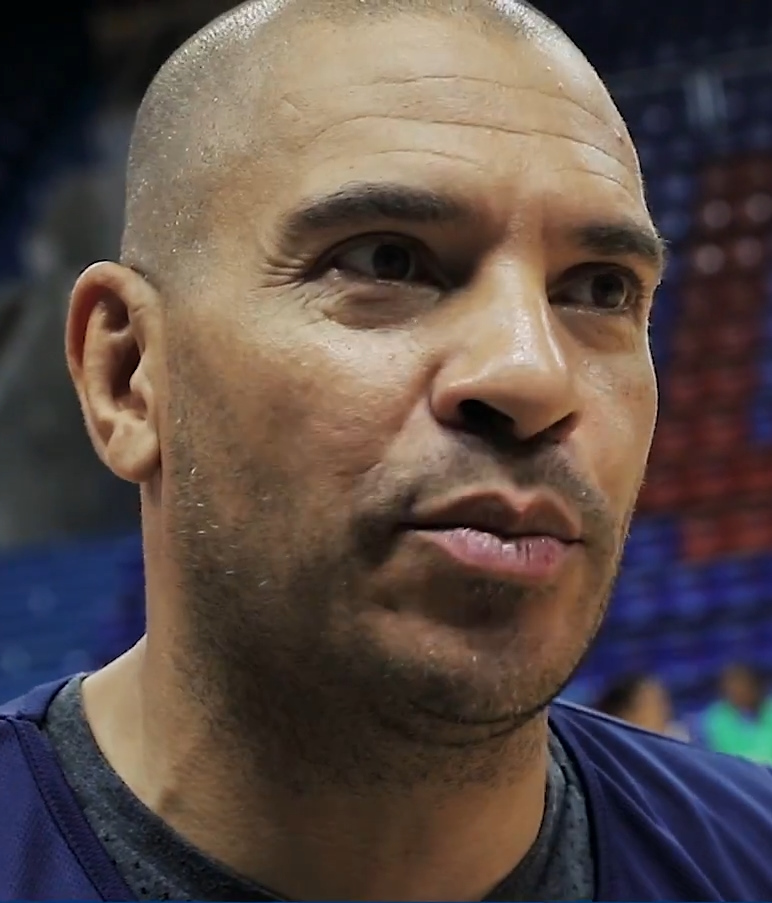
- Collymore in 2018

Personal information
- Full name: Stanley Victor Collymore
- Date of birth: 22 January 1971 (age 55)
- Place of birth: Tittensor, Staffordshire, England
- Position: Striker

Youth career
- 1987–1988: Walsall
- 1988–1989: Wolverhampton Wanderers

Senior career*
Years	Team	Apps	(Gls)
1989–1990	Stafford Rangers	35	(11)
1990–1992	Crystal Palace	20	(1)
1992–1993	Southend United	30	(15)
1993–1995	Nottingham Forest	65	(41)
1995–1997	Liverpool	64	(28)
1997–2000	Aston Villa	46	(7)
1999	→ Fulham (loan)	6	(0)
2000	Leicester City	11	(5)
2000–2001	Bradford City	7	(2)
2001	Real Oviedo	3	(0)
Total		287	(110)

International career
1995–1997	England	3	(0)
- * Club domestic league appearances and goals

Stanley Victor Collymore (born 22 January 1971) is an English football pundit, sport strategist, and former player who played as a striker from 1990 to 2001, most notably for Nottingham Forest and later Liverpool, who he joined from the former for an English transfer record of £8.5 million in 1995. In addition, he was Aston Villa's record signing

After his release from Wolves' academy, Collymore signed for non-league Stafford Rangers, where he caught the eye of First Division side Crystal Palace who signed him in January 1991. He failed to break into the first team and subsequently dropped down to the Second Division (renamed as the First Division in 1992) with Southend United, for whom his goalscoring record helped save from relegation and attract attention from Nottingham Forest, who he joined in the summer of 1993 for £2.25 million. Collymore enjoyed two prolific seasons at Forest, earning promotion to the Premier League in his first season and scoring 22 goals as Forest finished in third place during the 1994–95 season. Perennial title challengers Liverpool signed him in 1995, where he initially formed a successful partnership with Robbie Fowler, but was eventually ousted in favour of younger striker Michael Owen and sold on to boyhood club Aston Villa in 1997, where his form dipped and he struggled to break into the first team. After two unsuccessful years with Villa, he joined Leicester City in 2000 where he saw a brief career resurgence under Martin O'Neill, but struggled under his successor Peter Taylor and was sold to Bradford City in October 2000, but would leave the club after just 10 weeks due to his high wage bill. He then joined Real Oviedo of the Primera Liga, where he finished his career in March 2001 after just five weeks with the club.

While a talented and prolific goalscorer, Collymore's career was often marred by controversy, including his public struggles with mental health, outbursts on the pitch and arguments with coaches and teammates. During 2021, he became involved with the management of former club Southend United.

== Club career ==
=== Early career ===
Collymore was born at Groundslow Hospital, Tittensor, Staffordshire to a Barbadian father and English mother. He first took an interest in football as a child, and grew up supporting Aston Villa. He started playing soon after as a centre forward for Cannock Peelers and Penkridge Juniors, before starting his professional career as an apprentice with Walsall, and later Wolverhampton Wanderers, before being released and signing for then Conference team, Stafford Rangers.

=== Crystal Palace (1991–92) ===
While playing for Stafford Rangers, Collymore was spotted by a scout from First Division side Crystal Palace and signed with the club on 4 January 1991, when he was 19 years old. He made his first team debut for Palace on 23 April, coming on as a 76th minute substitute in a match against Liverpool. Collymore would remain with Palace for nearly two years, but struggled to find a place in the first team ahead of the prolific goalscoring partnership of Mark Bright and Ian Wright, and left the club in November 1992.

=== Southend United (1992–93) ===
Collymore joined First Division strugglers Southend United for £150,000 on 20 November 1992, as the club was stuck firmly in the second tier relegation battle with the likes of Birmingham, Oxford and Peterborough. Collymore would score 15 goals in 30 league appearances that season, with his goalscoring record and form helping Southend to claw their way out of the bottom three and finish the season in 18th, after being tipped by many to be relegated at the start of the season. Collymore later said "I count helping to keep Southend in the First Division in my season there as one of my finest achievements."

=== Nottingham Forest (1993–1995) ===
==== First Division (1993–94) ====
Collymore's work at Southend attracted attention from a number of different teams, including boyhood club Aston Villa of the Premiership and newly relegated Nottingham Forest. Frank Clark eventually signed him to the latter on 5 July 1993 for an initial fee of £2.25 million. Collymore's prolific goalscoring form continued with Forest, as he scored 19 goals in 28 games and led the attack as Forest became a fixture in the top of the table and looked to win automatic promotion back to the Premiership. This was realised on 30 April 1994, when a last minute winner from Collymore saw Forest beat Peterborough United 3–2, securing a second place finish and automatic promotion to English football's top flight.

==== Premiership (1994–95) ====
He made his first appearance for Forest in the Premiership on 22 August 1994, scoring a 26th minute equaliser in a 1–1 draw against Manchester United at City Ground. Collymore scored 22 goals as Forest remained a consistent challenger for a top 3 finish in 1994–95, and a thirteen game unbeaten run from February–May saw them finish third and earn a place in the next season's UEFA Cup. Despite success on the field, Collymore became an unpopular figure among his teammates, to the point that they refused to celebrate with him when he scored a goal. Midway through the season, his impressive goalscoring record had attracted attention from Manchester United, who wanted to replace past-his-peak Mark Hughes with a younger talent. Collymore spent almost the entirety of late 1994 linked with a move to Old Trafford, with himself and Newcastle United's Andy Cole named as Sir Alex Ferguson's most wanted targets. Eventually, Cole was signed by United for an English transfer record deal worth £7 million, while Collymore stayed at Forest for the remainder of the season; by the end of the campaign, however, he had received offers from Liverpool, Everton and Newcastle, with all three battling to earn his signature in the summer of 1995.

=== Liverpool (1995–1997) ===
==== 1995–96 ====
Roy Evans would sign the deal to bring Collymore to Liverpool on 3 July 1995 for £8.5 million, shattering the English transfer record set earlier in the year by Andy Cole's move to Manchester United. Collymore was initially placed in a forward partnership with veteran Ian Rush, though Rush was soon replaced with the younger Robbie Fowler early in the season. The up front pairing of Collymore and Fowler proved to be successful, as they scored a combined 55 goals in 1995–96 and established Evans' Liverpool side as serious contenders for that year's Premiership trophy. On 3 April 1996, with the title still very much up for grabs, Liverpool met league leaders Newcastle in a thrilling 4–3 win at Anfield, with Collymore scoring the winner in the second minute of stoppage time to severely weaken Newcastle's grip on first place and eventually play a part in them falling to second as Manchester United would take the trophy on the final day. This was later voted as the best match of the decade by the Premier League in 2003. Along with a strong league finish, Collymore was part of the Liverpool side that reached the 1996 FA Cup Final, played against Manchester United on 11 May 1996. Though he started the game, Collymore failed to get on the scoresheet and was subbed off in the 74th minute for Ian Rush, in what went on to be Rush's final appearance for the club. Collymore watched from the sidelines as Eric Cantona fired home the winning goal with five minutes left on the clock, consigning Liverpool to another year with no major silverware. It would be the closest that Collymore would come to winning a major trophy in his playing career.

==== 1996–97 ====
Expectations were high for Liverpool and the Collymore/Fowler partnership the following season after the promise they had shown in the previous campaign. Roy Evans' exciting young squad led the league for much of the first half of the season, but a series of poor performances in early 1997 saw them fall behind winners Manchester United and eventually finish 4th. Collymore was again a regular fixture in the attack and was a consistent goalscorer and creator, but became the subject of increasing media scrutiny throughout the season, as tabloids accused him and most of his teammates of being unprofessional, with the squad being dubbed the "Spice Boys" by newspapers in 1997. He eventually fell out of favour with Evans, and was gradually replaced with the up-and-coming Michael Owen towards the end of the season. As his starts for Liverpool became more sporadic, rumours of his departure from Anfield began to circulate prior to the summer.

=== Aston Villa (1997–2000) ===
==== 1997–98 ====
Rumours of his exit from Liverpool were confirmed on 16 May 1997 when 26-year-old Collymore was signed by boyhood club Aston Villa, then under Brian Little, for a club record £7 million. Collymore debuted for the Villans on 9 August 1997 in a 1–0 loss to Leicester City. He scored his first club goal on 27 August, in a 3–2 loss against Tottenham. On 4 October, he was sent off after getting into a fistfight with Bolton Wanderers' Andy Todd and subsequently handed a three match ban by the F.A. His debut season for Villa coincided with a major dip in form, as well as injury and disciplinary problems, as he managed just six goals all season and struggled to break into the starting lineup ahead of longtime main striker Dwight Yorke. During a match against Liverpool on 28 February 1998, Collymore accused former teammate Steve Harkness of racist abuse, an incident that was later picked up by the Professional Footballer's Association (PFA), but went unresolved and was closed after both players met in private and agreed to move on without charges. Off the field, Collymore was involved in an incident on 9 June 1998 where he assaulted girlfriend Ulrika Jonsson in a Paris bar, which he later apologised for.

==== 1998–99 ====
The 1998–99 season saw Collymore score just once in 19 appearances, as his issues off the field came to a head. In a match against Liverpool on 21 November 1998, Collymore was given a yellow card for a 9th minute tackle on defender Steve Harkness that caused the latter to be carried off the pitch and suffer ligament damage; Collymore was later shown a second yellow and sent off for another rash challenge on Michael Owen. Given his history with Harkness, Collymore was accused of holding a grudge and purposely trying to injure his former teammate; he denied the allegations. Shortly after this, he began to publicly struggle with his mental health, and was diagnosed with clinical depression, stress and anxiety in January 1999. Following this, he announced he would seek counselling and checked himself into the Priory Group Hospital in Roehampton, where he stayed for several weeks. He returned to the Villa side later in the season, but after a 3–0 loss to Chelsea on 21 March 1999, manager John Gregory dropped him from the first team for the rest of the season. This would go on to be his last appearance for Aston Villa.

=== Fulham (1999) ===
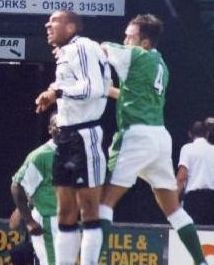
Collymore (left) playing for Fulham in 1999

After a summer move to Greek side Panathinaikos failed to materialise, Collymore was sent out on a three month loan to Fulham at the start of the 1999–2000 season, with an option for the club to sign him for £1 million at the end. While he failed to make a major impact and was not signed, he did score the winner in a 2–1 League Cup win over West Bromwich Albion on 12 October 1999.

=== Leicester (2000) ===
==== 1999–2000 ====
Collymore and Aston Villa mutually agreed to separate after he returned from his loan spell at Fulham, and he spent the rest of 1999 training with the youth team and looking for a new club. Ligue 1 outfit Montpellier HSC showed interest, but rescinded their offer after Collymore refused to play in a practice match before signing. Newly promoted Bradford City also tried and failed to sign him, put off by Villa's £3 million asking price. He eventually joined Leicester City for free on a pay-as-you-play basis on 11 February 2000. Just days after signing for the club, he made front page news during a team break in Spain, when he set off a fire extinguisher during a night of drinking inside La Manga Club, which resulted in £700 of damage to the bar and the entire team being sent home. Collymore was fined £30,000 and ordered to undertake community work by boss Martin O'Neill for the incident; O'Neill also warned Collymore that he would terminate his contract if any more incidents like this would occur. After returning to England, his second appearance and home debut for the club saw him score a hat-trick in a 5–2 drubbing of Sunderland. He would score four times in six appearances in his debut campaign for the Foxes, a season that saw them reach the League Cup Final, where they defeated Tranmere Rovers 2–1, though Collymore, having turned out for Fulham earlier in the season, was cup-tied and unable to feature. Collymore was stretchered off the pitch during a game against Derby County on 2 April after just 17 minutes, having audibly screamed and collapsed in the middle of the pitch. Scans later revealed he had suffered a broken left leg after an awkward landing, and he missed the rest of the season.

==== 2000–01 ====
Having fully recovered, Collymore remained with Leicester through the summer transfer window and was thought to be the club's new first choice striker after Emile Heskey had left for Liverpool in the summer; however, with Martin O'Neill having departed Leicester to manage Celtic, he was dropped by replacement manager Peter Taylor in favour of new signing Ade Akinbiyi and instead often brought on as a midfield substitute. He scored once more for the Foxes, in a 2–0 win against Chelsea at Stamford Bridge on 17 September 2000. On 24 September, during a 1–1 draw against Everton, Collymore was alleged to have "stamped on, and later elbowed" Paul Gascoigne. While referee Alan Wiley claimed he did not see the incident and Collymore was not punished during the game, he was later ordered to attend a disciplinary hearing by the FA on 28 November. Two days after the incident with Gascoigne, Collymore submitted a transfer request to Leicester. He would later retract this request, but manager Peter Taylor still placed him on the transfer list, citing Collymore's poor fitness, lack of commitment and attitude problems. Having fallen out of favour with another manager, and demoted to the reserve squad, where he was involved in a half time altercation with teammate Trevor Benjamin, Collymore and Leicester would eventually agree to part ways, and he was allowed to leave on a free transfer in October 2000.

=== Bradford City (2000–2001) ===
Collymore was immediately signed by longtime admirers Bradford City on 26 October 2000, a move described as "desperate" by BBC Sport pundit Mark Lawrenson. He made his Bradford debut in a West Yorkshire derby against Leeds United at Valley Parade on 29 October, scoring a memorable overhead kick in a 1–1 draw, however, his controversial celebration in front of the away crowd caused uproar and led to two Leeds fans being restrained by stewards. Collymore subsequently faced additional charges from the F.A. for the incident. He was substituted at half-time in his second game as Bradford lost 4–3 to Newcastle United in the League Cup, and missed the following game at Charlton Athletic because of flu and a sore wisdom tooth. In Collymore's absence, City lost 2–0, and manager Chris Hutchings was sacked two days later. Jim Jefferies soon took over as new City manager, and Collymore once again led the front line in Jefferies' first home game in charge against Coventry City, scoring Bradford's first goal. On 28 November, he attended a disciplinary hearing for the incident with Paul Gascoigne while he was still at Leicester, and upon video review of the incident, he was handed a three match ban, which meant he would miss key games against Liverpool, Sunderland and Chelsea. After returning from his ban, Collymore, and other highly paid players Benito Carbone and Dan Petrescu were transfer-listed in January 2001 by chairman Geoffrey Richmond in a bid to reduce the club's high wage bill. VFB Stuttgart and Celtic both made offers for Collymore, but he would eventually choose to sign with Spanish outfit Real Oviedo after just 8 games and 10 weeks with Bradford.

=== Real Oviedo (2001) ===
Collymore signed an 18 month contract with Primera Liga side Real Oviedo on 31 January 2001. He made his debut for Oviedo as a second-half substitute in a 1–0 defeat to Las Palmas on 4 February 2001. He was again brought on during the second half of his home debut a week later in a loss against Villarreal, but was dropped by coach Radomir Antić after the game and told to improve his fitness. He played just one more game for Oviedo, another loss against Celta Vigo on 3 March, before announcing his retirement on 7 March 2001 at the age of 30, just five weeks after he had joined Oviedo; he did not tell the club of his plans beforehand and they only found out through the Spanish tabloids. A statement issued through his spokesman said, "Stan Collymore has decided, after discussions with his family and close friends, to give up playing professional football. He has just turned 30 and believes that the time is right to explore other career opportunities which are available to him." He was offered a chance to return to Southend United and was also approached by Boston United and Wolverhampton Wanderers, but never made a return to football, however, he applied but was turned down for the manager's position at Bradford City following the dismissal of Jim Jefferies in December 2001. Before the end of the year, Oviedo had begun court proceedings against Collymore for breach of his contract, unsuccessfully suing him for £7 million.

== International career ==
After an impressive debut season in the Premier League, Collymore was called up to Terry Venables' England squad for the Umbro Cup in June 1995. The 24-year-old made his début at Wembley Stadium against Japan, partnering Alan Shearer in a 2–1 win. He won his second cap as a 90th minute substitute against Brazil.

Collymore made his third and final appearance for England as a substitute in a 4–0 win over Moldova during qualification for the 1998 FIFA World Cup.

== Post-playing career ==
Collymore contributed to his biography Stan: Tackling my demons with Oliver Holt. In 2005, he played the character Kevin Franks in the film Basic Instinct 2 alongside Sharon Stone.

On 20 October 2008, Collymore won more than £1.5 million in damages from his financial advisers, for the poor investment advice he had been given since retiring from professional football in 2001. The judge ruled that Collymore had been given advice that was in breach of statutory obligations.

Collymore worked as a football pundit and presenter on the Talksport radio station for eight years between 2008 and 2016. He also worked as a commentator for BT Sport, he was released from his contract in 2015 for criticising their lack of action regarding sectarian chanting during a game between Rangers and Raith Rovers. He writes a column for caughtoffside.com.

== Return to football with Southend United ==
In April 2021, Collymore wrote to Southend United chairman Ron Martin offering to buy the club from him, and held talks concerning the potential appointment of a Collymore associate as the club's CEO; in May, Tom Lawrence was appointed.

In October, Collymore, Martin, Lawrence and director Gary Lockett formed a panel to appoint a new club manager following the sacking of Phil Brown. Collymore offered further free support, as the club was described as "a mess" by the BBC, and Lawrence started negotiations with Collymore about a formal role with the club. Collymore was announced as the club's senior football strategist on 4 November 2021.

== Personal life ==
Collymore has talked openly about his mental health issues. He began to seek counselling after he was diagnosed with clinical depression, stress and anxiety in 1999 while playing for Aston Villa. He also stated in his autobiography that he has been diagnosed with borderline personality disorder (BPD). Since retiring, he has continued to struggle with depression, and uses his X (social network) account to raise awareness of the condition.

He is a supporter of Republic, a British republican pressure group advocating the replacement of the monarchy of the United Kingdom with a de jure parliamentary republic. He supported the Labour Party before leaving them for the Scottish National Party (SNP) in December 2015 after a notable minority of Labour MPs supported airstrikes in Syria.

=== Incidents ===
In early 1998, Collymore was accused of assault by the mother of his child, Michelle Green; she alleged he had punched her in the face and caused injury after an argument regarding their son on 22 December 1997. Collymore denied the accusations, and was found not guilty and cleared of any charges at a court hearing on 28 April 1998. Around the same time, he was in a relationship with the Swedish-British television presenter and model Ulrika Jonsson, which ended after he assaulted her in a Paris bar on 9 June 1998. He later apologised for the incident.

Collymore made front page news in February 2000 while playing for Leicester City, when, during a team break in Spain, he set off a fire extinguisher during a night of drinking inside La Manga Club which resulted in the entire team being sent home and banned from the resort. Collymore was fined £30,000 and ordered to undertake community work by boss Martin O'Neill for the incident. Later, in December 2000, while playing for Bradford City, Collymore suffered a broken nose after he was assaulted by two men in a Birmingham nightclub. He was subsequently cautioned by manager Jim Jefferies.

In 2004, Collymore was accused of taking part in dogging at Cannock Chase by an undercover News of the World reporter. He lost his job at BBC Radio 5 Live over the incident.

== Career statistics ==
=== Club ===
Appearances and goals by club, season and competition
Club	Season	League			National cup (Note: Includes FA Cup)		League cup (Note: Includes FA League Cup)		Continental		Other		Total	
Club	Season	Division	Apps	Goals	Apps	Goals	Apps	Goals	Apps	Goals	Apps	Goals	Apps	Goals
Nottingham Forest	1993–94	First Division			0	0	4	5	–		–			
Nottingham Forest	1994–95	Premier League	37	22	2	1	4	2	–		–		43	25
Nottingham Forest	Total				2	1	8	7	0	0	0	0		
Liverpool	1995–96	Premier League	31	14	7	5	4	0	2	0	–		44	19
Liverpool	1996–97	Premier League	30	12	2	2	0	0	5	2	–		37	16
Liverpool	Total		61	26	9	7	4	0	7	2	0	0	81	35
Aston Villa	1997–98	Premier League	25	6	4	1	1	0	7	1	–		37	8
Aston Villa	1998–99	Premier League	20	1	1	2	0	0	3	4	–		24	7
Aston Villa	Total		45	7	5	3	1	0	10	5	0	0	61	15
Fulham (loan)	1999–2000	Championship	6	0	0	0	3	1	–		–		9	1
Leicester City	1999–2000	Premier League	6	4	0	0	0	0	–		–		6	4
Leicester City	2000–01	Premier League	5	1	0	0	0	0	1	0	–		6	1
Leicester City	Total		11	5	0	0	0	0	1	0	0	0	12	5
Bradford City	2000–01	Premier League	7	2	0	0	1	0	–		–		8	2
Real Oviedo	1999–2000	Primera División	3	0	0	0	–		–		–		3	0

== Honours ==
Liverpool

- FA Cup runner-up: 1995–96

Individual

- PFA Team of the Year: 1993–94 First Division
- Premier League Player of the Month: January 1996
