= Simon Grayson =

English footballer and coach (born 1969)

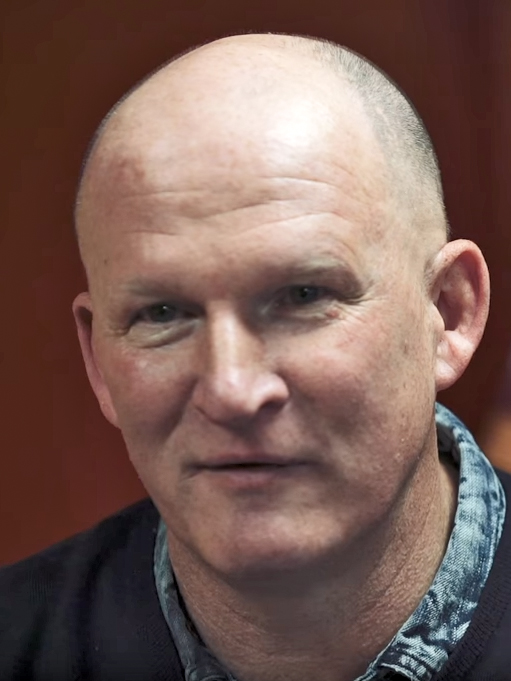
- Grayson in 2018

Personal information
- Full name: Simon Nicholas Grayson
- Date of birth: 16 December 1969 (age 56)
- Place of birth: Ripon, England
- Height: 1.83 m (6 ft 0 in)
- Positions: Right back; midfielder

Team information
- Current team: Indonesia (assistant coach)

Youth career
- 1984–1988: Leeds United

Senior career*
Years	Team	Apps	(Gls)
1988–1992	Leeds United	2	(0)
1992–1997	Leicester City	188	(4)
1997–1999	Aston Villa	48	(0)
1999–2002	Blackburn Rovers	34	(0)
2000	→ Sheffield Wednesday (loan)	5	(0)
2001	→ Stockport County (loan)	13	(0)
2001	→ Notts County (loan)	10	(1)
2002	→ Bradford City (loan)	7	(0)
2002–2006	Blackpool	126	(6)
Total		433	(11)

Managerial career
- 2005–2008: Blackpool
- 2008–2012: Leeds United
- 2012–2013: Huddersfield Town
- 2013–2017: Preston North End
- 2017: Sunderland
- 2018: Bradford City
- 2019–2020: Blackpool
- 2021: Fleetwood Town
- 2022–2023: Bengaluru
- 2025: Lalitpur City
- 2025: Hartlepool United
- * Club domestic league appearances and goals

Simon Nicholas Grayson (born 16 December 1969) is an English professional football manager and former player who is assistant coach of the Indonesia national team.

As a player, he was a right back, but he was also utilised in midfield in a career that lasted from 1988 until 2006. Having started his career with Leeds United, he played in the Premier League for Leicester City, Aston Villa and Blackburn Rovers, before moving into the Football League with Sheffield Wednesday, Stockport County, Notts County, Bradford City and Blackpool. He won promotion twice with Leicester City, both via the playoffs, in 1993–94 and 1995–96, and followed it up with a League Cup win in 1996–97. His next piece of silverware came at Blackpool in 2003–04, when he lifted the Football League Trophy.

He was appointed as player-manager of Blackpool in 2005, and a year later retired from playing to concentrate on the managerial side of his job. He guided the club to promotion, via the playoffs, from League One to the Championship in 2006–07.

In 2008, he was appointed manager of Leeds United, leading them to promotion to the Championship in 2010. Dismissed in February 2012, he moved to Huddersfield Town, where he again gained promotion from League One via the play-offs, beating Sheffield United in the final. In February 2013, Grayson became the new manager of Preston North End, winning promotion from League One to the Championship with them in 2014–15, and later had short spells in charge of Sunderland, Bradford City, Blackpool again and Fleetwood Town.

== Playing career ==
He started playing football for Bedale FC after going through high school at Bedale High School. In June 1988 Grayson began his career with the club he had supported as a boy, Leeds United. At Leeds he played as either a defender or midfielder, however, he did not manage to become a first-team regular, playing just twice in four years. He signed for Leicester City in March 1992 and went on to make 229 appearances in five years. During his time at Filbert Street the team won the League Cup in 1997, with Grayson scoring the goal against Wimbledon which put them in the final, and was voted the club's player of the season in the same year.

Grayson moved to Brian Little's Aston Villa in 1997 and made another 49 Premier League appearances at Villa Park, scoring two goals, both of which came in Villa's 1997–98 FA Cup campaign against Portsmouth and West Bromwich Albion. He then signed for Blackburn Rovers in July 1999, where he made 34 appearances in his first season. He lost his place in the team the following season and spent most of the next two years on loan, with spells at Sheffield Wednesday, Stockport County, Notts County (where he scored once against Reading) and Bradford City. Grayson signed for Blackpool on a free transfer on 19 July 2002. He made more than 100 appearances for the Seasiders and captained the side. He started his career at Blackpool in the right-back berth, but was moved to midfield by former boss Colin Hendry to bolster an area of weakness. In 2004 he started the final as Blackpool won the 2003–04 Football League Trophy.

== Managerial career ==
=== Blackpool ===
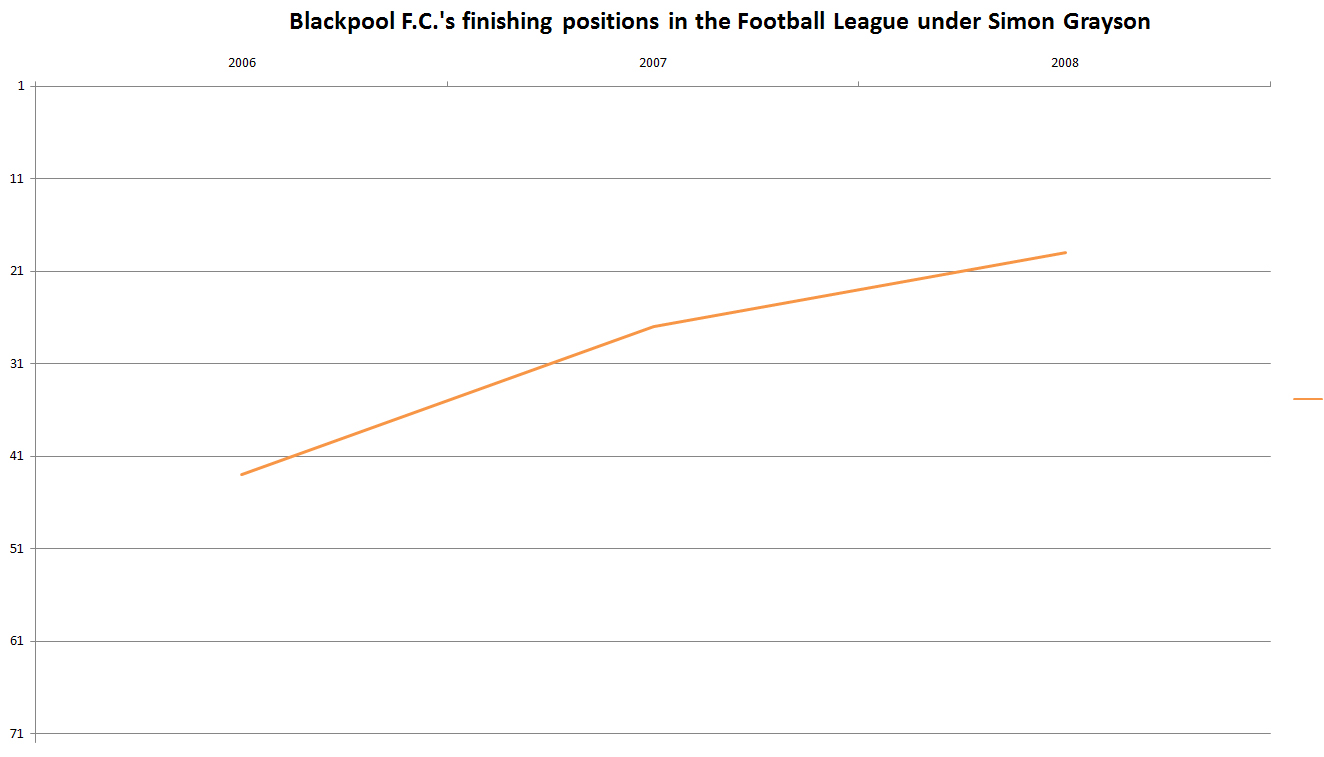
Blackpool's finishing positions in the Football League under Grayson. 2008's finish of 19th surpassed the previous high of 1971–72, under Bob Stokoe

Grayson moved into coaching in the 2004–05 season, managing the reserve squad at Bloomfield Road with some success. He was named caretaker manager of the first team in November 2005, following the departure of Colin Hendry. After diverting Blackpool away from relegation that season he was given the job on a permanent basis for the start of the 2006–07 season. Grayson retired from playing at the end of the 2005–06 season to focus purely on the managerial side of the game.

In late 2006, he led Blackpool to only one defeat in fourteen league games, a sequence that included five wins out of six, resulting in their appearance in the four play-off positions. The run also brought attendances of more than 7,000 to Bloomfield Road. This led to Grayson being awarded the Manager of the Month award for December.

On 6 January 2007, he guided Blackpool to the fourth round of the FA Cup for the first time in 17 years, after beating Aldershot Town 4–2 at Bloomfield Road. They were knocked out by Norwich City, who beat them 3–2 after extra time, in a replay at Carrow Road on 13 February, narrowly missing out on a trip to London to face Chelsea in the last sixteen.

Grayson received his second League One Manager of the Month award of the 2006–07 season in May 2007. Two days later, on 5 May 2007, Grayson guided Blackpool to a final placing of third, and thus a place in the play-offs. Blackpool beat Oldham Athletic 5–2 on aggregate over the two legs of the play-off semi-final. They met Yeovil Town in the final at the newly renovated Wembley Stadium on 27 May and won 2–0, securing promotion to the Championship. It was their tenth consecutive victory, a new club record. This was extended in Blackpool's first game in the Championship with a league win over Leicester City and a victory against Huddersfield Town in the League Cup.

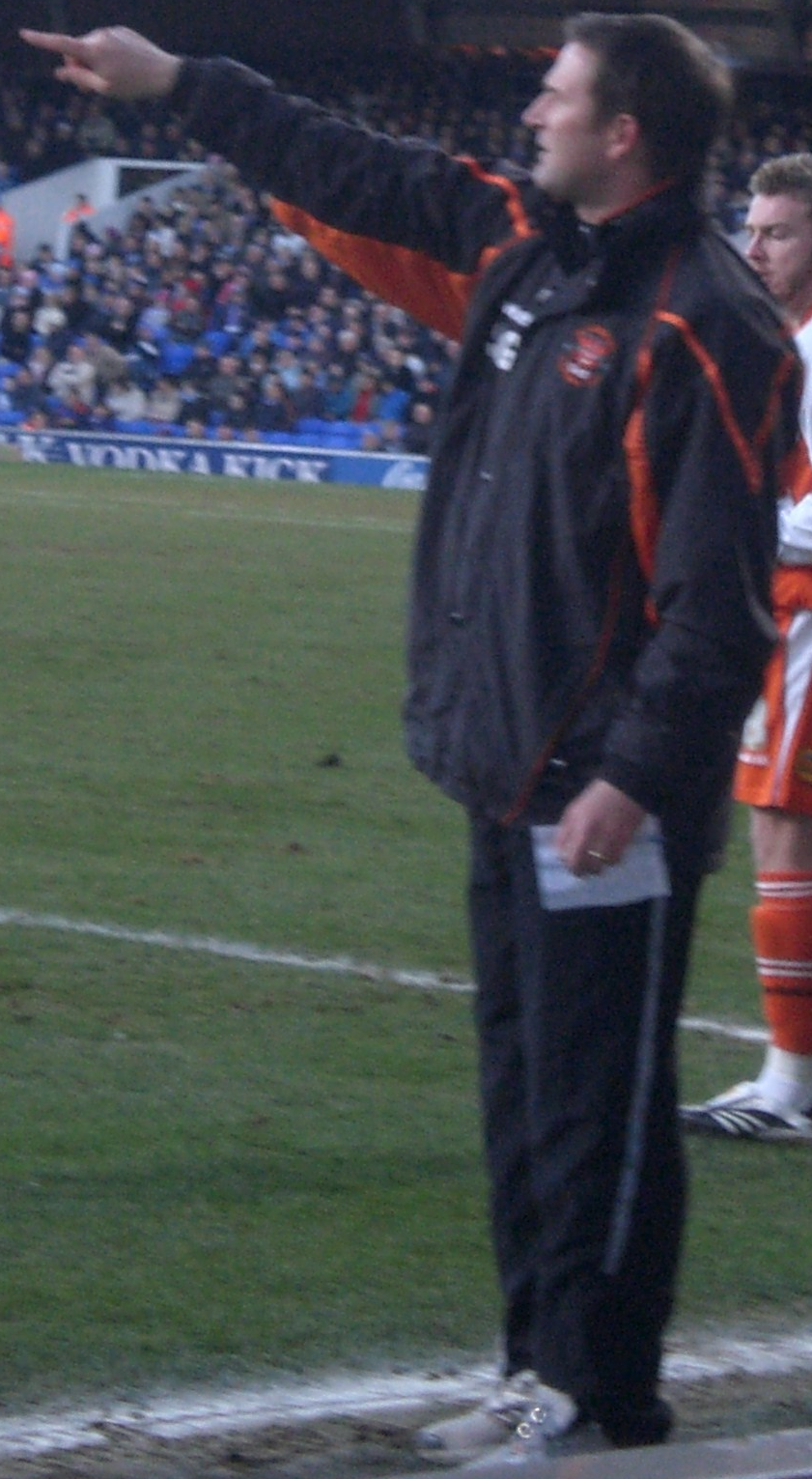
Grayson as manager of Blackpool in 2008

In October 2007, Grayson guided Blackpool to the fourth round of the League Cup for the club's first time in 35 years. They were drawn against Tottenham Hotspur at White Hart Lane, where Spurs won 2–0. In December 2007 Grayson signed a two-and-a-half-year contract, following two years working without a formal contract. In May 2008, Blackpool finished nineteenth in the Championship.

Grayson was heavily linked with the vacant managerial post at Leeds United, with whom he started his playing career, following the dismissal of Gary McAllister in December 2008, but Blackpool refused permission for Leeds to speak to Grayson. Despite this Grayson tendered his resignation, which the Blackpool board did not accept, and he was announced as Leeds United's new manager. The two clubs ultimately settled the dispute for an undisclosed fee.

=== Leeds United ===
Grayson's first game in charge was at Elland Road on Boxing Day against one of his former clubs, Leicester City, who were top of League One. Leeds were sitting in 9th place, on the back of five straight defeats, but a late equaliser from Robert Snodgrass gave Grayson's new club a 1–1 draw. He recorded his first victory, a crucial 3–1 win away at Stockport County two days later. Leeds won their final eleven home games, matching a forty-year-old record from the Don Revie era. Leeds' away form did not match this, and Grayson guided the club into a fourth-place finish, earning them a two-legged play-off tie against fifth-place Millwall, which Leeds lost 2–1 on aggregate.

Grayson and Leeds started the 2009–10 season with an unbeaten run in all competitions, which included seven victories and a draw in League One and saw the club progress to the third round of the League Cup, before losing 1–0 to Liverpool. In that season's FA Cup, Grayson led Leeds to a 1–0 victory away to Manchester United, their first win at Old Trafford since 1981. Grayson's side also earned Leeds a replay against Premiership opposition Tottenham Hotspur after a 2–2 draw at White Hart Lane.

Grayson's Leeds side was promoted on 8 May 2010 after beating Bristol Rovers 2–1 in their final game coming back from 0–1 with only 10 men. The win saw Leeds finish the season in second place, and earn automatic promotion to The Championship. Grayson reached his 100th game managing Leeds in the 2–1 win against Middlesbrough.

Grayson was rewarded with his first Manager of the Month award while in charge at Leeds United for the month of December 2010. During that month he oversaw his Leeds team unbeaten in the league, winning three games and drawing two, including a 2–0 home win over league leaders QPR. After a dip in form, Leeds dropped out of the playoff places and finished the season in 7th place.

On 1 February 2012, Grayson was dismissed by Leeds United due to lack of results he was getting. A Club Statement said: "We have 18 games to go this season and are still within touching distance of the Play-Offs, but felt with the transfer window now closed we needed to make the change at this time in the belief that a new managerial team will be able to get more out of the existing squad of players and make the difference". His last result was a 4–1 defeat to Birmingham City on 31 January 2012.

=== Huddersfield Town ===
On 20 February 2012, just five days after Lee Clark was dismissed as manager, Grayson became the new manager of League One club Huddersfield Town on a 3 1/2-year deal. His first game in charge of the Terriers was in their 2–0 home victory over Exeter City when both defender Jamie McCombe and leading striker Jordan Rhodes scoring. He also introduced Icelandic midfielder Joey Guðjónsson to the squad for the first time all season. While remaining unbeaten, his next five games in charge proved to be mostly unspectacular, resulting in four draws against Stevenage, Bury, Rochdale and Colchester United, also defeating Hartlepool United in a 1–0 home victory. The early pattern of these results remained similar to those of the previous manager, Lee Clark, who managed a number of draws, which were held responsible for the Terrier's inability to cement a place in the automatic promotion spots. With 10 games remaining, Town occupied 4th position in League One, contrary to the chairman Dean Hoyle's brief urging the club to reach one of the top two positions. On 26 May 2012, Grayson led Huddersfield to play-off victory over Sheffield United, gaining promotion to the Championship.

Grayson's first match in charge of Huddersfield in the Championship came on 17 August 2012, a 1–0 defeat away to Cardiff. His first Championship win as the club's manager was on 25 August 2012, a 2–0 home victory against Burnley. On 1 December 2012, Grayson managed Huddersfield against his former side Leeds for the first time, losing 4–2 at home.

He was dismissed by Huddersfield on 24 January 2013, following a run of 12 consecutive matches without victory stretching back to 17 November 2012.

=== Preston North End ===
Simon Grayson was appointed manager of Preston North End on 18 February 2013 and went unbeaten in his first four games in charge. Grayson then went on to keep the club clear of relegation with four games to go. Safety was confirmed after a 2–0 home win against Oldham Athletic on 9 April 2013.

In May 2014 Grayson guided Preston North End into the League One play off semi-final against Rotherham United. However, after drawing the first leg at Deepdale 1–1, North End lost the return leg 3–1 despite taking an early lead through Paul Gallagher.

Twelve months later, Grayson guided Preston back to the second tier of English football after being absent for four years with a victory over Swindon Town in the League One play-off final. It was their first success in the play-offs in 10 attempts and was notable for Jermaine Beckford's three goals, becoming only the third player to ever score a play-off final hat-trick at Wembley.

=== Sunderland ===
On 29 June 2017, Grayson was named as the new manager of newly relegated Championship club Sunderland, replacing David Moyes, on a three-year contract. His first league game as manager came on 4 August 2017, where his side drew 1–1 at the Stadium of Light against Derby County. In his following fixture, his team defeated Norwich City at Carrow Road, with the final result 3–1, Sunderland went on to record another draw, before commencing a four-game losing streak, until drawing one again. After a 2–1 defeat to Cardiff City, Sunderland dropped into relegation zone. On 26 September 2017, his team suffered a 5–2 loss to Ipswich Town at Portman Road, with them moving down to twenty-third place in their division. Grayson's team then recorded three consecutive draws; however, they did not move from their league position. He was dismissed after a 3–3 home draw with Bolton Wanderers on 31 October.

=== Bradford City ===
On 11 February 2018, Grayson was announced as the manager of League One club Bradford City, following the dismissal of Stuart McCall. He won three out of 14 games as they finished 11th, and left at the end of his contract in May.

=== Return to Blackpool ===
On 6 July 2019, the day after Terry McPhillips announced his resignation, Grayson was appointed Blackpool manager on a two-year contract. He was sacked on 12 February 2020, after a spell of four points from a possible 27 brought them from 4th place to 15th in League One. He managed Kendal Town for one game in October 2020, covering for the self-isolating Chris Humphrey.

=== Fleetwood Town ===
On 31 January 2021, Grayson was appointed manager of Fleetwood Town, following the departure of previous manager Joey Barton. Grayson left Fleetwood on 24 November 2021.

=== Bengaluru ===
On 8 June 2022, Indian Super League side Bengaluru announced the appointment of Grayson on a two-year deal. He reached the 2022–23 ISL Final with Bengaluru but lost on penalties to ATK Mohun Bagan.

On 9 December 2023, he mutually agreed to part ways with the club after a 4–0 defeat to Mumbai City.

=== Lalitpur City ===
Grayson was appointed head coach of Nepal Super League club Lalitpur City on 2 February 2025. He led the team to their second-consecutive Nepal Super League title on 26 April 2025.

=== Hartlepool United ===
On 12 June 2025, Grayson was appointed head coach of National League club Hartlepool United. Grayson had been a target for owner Raj Singh for the vacant manager job at Hartlepool on previous occasions. He was appointed amidst uncertainty surrounding the future ownership of the club. Hartlepool saw a significant turnover of players during pre-season with Grayson handing debuts to eight new signings for the first match of the season, a 0–0 draw at Yeovil Town. Hartlepool took 10 points from their opening four matches under Grayson. However, after a run of one win in 11 games in all competitions, Grayson was dismissed on 12 October following a 1–1 away draw with seventh tier side Gainsborough Trinity in the FA Cup fourth qualifying round. He departed after 14 league games with four wins, six draws and four defeats and with the club in 12th position in the National League.

== Personal life ==
Grayson's son, Joe, made his competitive debut for Blackburn Rovers on 28 August 2018. In doing so the pair became the third father-son duo to play for the club. He is brother to former professional cricketer Paul Grayson.

== Career statistics ==
Appearances and goals by club, season and competition
Club	Season	League			FA Cup		League Cup		Other		Europe		Total	
Club	Season	Division	Apps	Goals	Apps	Goals	Apps	Goals	Apps	Goals	Apps	Goals	Apps	Goals
Leeds United	1987–88	Second Division	2	0	0	0	0	0	1 (Note: Appearance in Full Members' Cup)	0	—		3	0
Leeds United	1991–92	First Division	0	0	0	0	0	0	1	0	—		1	0
Leeds United	Total		2	0	0	0	0	0	2	0	—		4	0
Leicester City	1991–92	Second Division	13	0	0	0	0	0	3 (Note: Appearances in Second Division play-offs)	0	—		16	0
Leicester City	1992–93	First Division	24	1	0	0	2	0	3 (Note: Two appearances in Anglo-Italian Cup and one appearance in First Division play-offs)	0	—		29	1
Leicester City	1993–94	First Division	40	1	1	0	3	0	5 (Note: Two appearances in Anglo-Italian Cup and three appearances in First Division play-offs)	0	—		49	1
Leicester City	1994–95	Premier League	34	0	3	0	2	0	0	0	—		39	0
Leicester City	1995–96	First Division	41	2	2	0	4	0	3 (Note: Appearances in First Division play-offs)	0	—		50	2
Leicester City	1996–97	Premier League	36	0	3	0	7	2	0	0	—		46	2
Leicester City	Total		188	4	9	0	18	2	14	0	—		229	6
Aston Villa	1997–98	Premier League	33	0	4	2	1	0	0	0	6 (Note: Appearances in UEFA Cup)	0	44	2
Aston Villa	1998–99	Premier League	15	0	1	0	1	0	0	0	3	0	20	0
Aston Villa	Total		48	0	5	2	2	0	0	0	9	0	64	2
Blackburn Rovers	1999–2000	First Division	34	0	3	0	1	0	0	0	—		38	0
Blackburn Rovers	2000–01	First Division	0	0	0	0	1	0	0	0	—		1	0
Blackburn Rovers	Total		34	0	3	0	2	0	0	0	—		39	0
Sheffield Wednesday (loan)	2000–01	First Division	5	0	0	0	0	0	0	0	—		5	0
Stockport County (loan)	2000–01	First Division	13	0	1	0	0	0	0	0	—		14	0
Notts County (loan)	2001–02	Second Division	10	1	0	0	1	0	2 (Note: Appearance(s) in Football League Trophy)	0	—		13	1
Bradford City (loan)	2001–02	First Division	7	0	0	0	0	0	0	0	—		7	0
Blackpool	2002–03	Second Division	45	3	3	0	1	0	1	0	—		50	3
Blackpool	2003–04	Second Division	33	1	2	0	3	0	5	0	—		43	1
Blackpool	2004–05	League One	36	2	4	0	1	0	2	0	—		43	2
Blackpool	2005–06	League One	12	0	1	0	2	1	1	0	—		16	1
Blackpool	Total		126	6	10	0	7	1	9	0	—		152	7
Career total			433	11	28	2	30	3	27	0	9	0	527	16

== Managerial statistics ==
As of match played 12 October 2025

Managerial record by team and tenure
Team	From	To	Record					Ref
Team	From	To	P	W	D	L	Win %	Ref
Blackpool	10 November 2005	23 December 2008	163	60	51	52	36.81	
Leeds United	23 December 2008	1 February 2012	169	84	40	45	49.70	
Huddersfield Town	20 February 2012	24 January 2013	49	17	15	17	34.69	
Preston North End	18 February 2013	29 June 2017	235	104	74	57	44.26	
Sunderland	29 June 2017	31 October 2017	18	3	7	8	16.67	
Bradford City	11 February 2018	8 May 2018	14	3	5	6	21.43	
Blackpool	6 July 2019	12 February 2020	38	13	12	13	34.21	
Fleetwood Town	31 January 2021	24 November 2021	43	13	10	20	30.23	
Bengaluru	8 June 2022	9 December 2023	48	22	12	14	45.83	
Lalitpur City	2 February 2025	12 June 2025	8	5	3	0	62.50	
Hartlepool United	12 June 2025	12 October 2025	15	4	7	4	26.67	
Total			799	328	236	235	41.05	—

== Honours ==
=== Player ===
Leicester City

- Football League First Division play-offs: 1994, 1996
- Football League Cup: 1996–97

Blackpool

- Football League Trophy: 2003–04

Individual

- Leicester City Player of the Season: 1993–94, 1996–97

=== Manager ===
Blackpool

- Football League One play-offs: 2007

Leeds United

- Football League One second-place promotion: 2009–10

Huddersfield Town

- Football League One play-offs: 2012

Preston North End

- Football League One play-offs: 2015

Bengaluru

- Durand Cup: 2022
- Indian Super League runner-up: 2022–23
- Indian Super Cup runner-up: 2023

Lalitpur City

- Nepal Super League: 2025

Individual

- Football League Championship Manager of the Month: December 2010
- Football League One Manager of the Month: December 2006, April 2007, September 2013, October 2014, February 2015
