= Gareth Barry =

English footballer (born 1981)

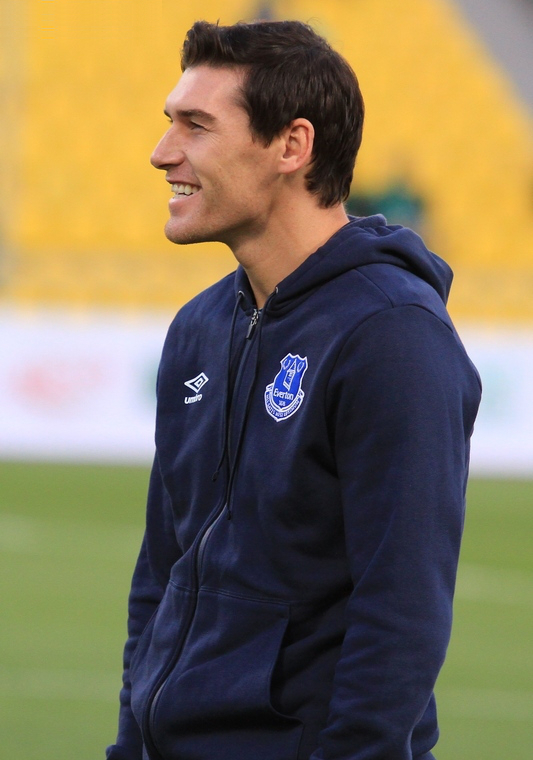
- Barry with Everton in 2014

Personal information
- Full name: Gareth Barry
- Date of birth: 23 February 1981 (age 45)
- Place of birth: Hastings, England
- Height: 6 ft 1 in (1.85 m)
- Position: Defensive midfielder

Youth career
- 1991–1997: Brighton & Hove Albion
- 1997–1998: Aston Villa

Senior career*
Years	Team	Apps	(Gls)
1998–2009	Aston Villa	365	(41)
2009–2014	Manchester City	132	(6)
2013–2014	→ Everton (loan)	32	(3)
2014–2017	Everton	99	(2)
2017–2020	West Bromwich Albion	52	(2)
2024–2025	Hurstpierpoint	2	(1)
Total		682	(55)

International career
1997–1998	England U16	6	(0)
1998–1999	England U18	5	(0)
1998–2003	England U21	27	(2)
2007	England B	1	(0)
2000–2012	England	53	(3)
- * Club domestic league appearances and goals

Gareth Barry (born 23 February 1981) is an English former professional footballer who played as a defensive midfielder. He made a total of 653 Premier League appearances for Aston Villa, Manchester City, Everton, and West Bromwich Albion, the second most appearances in Premier League history. He also represented England at international level.

Barry moved to Aston Villa from Brighton & Hove Albion as a youngster, and spent 12 years at the club. He captained Aston Villa and is eighth in their all-time list of appearances, with 441 across all competitions, including 365 in the Premier League. He joined Manchester City for a fee of £12 million in June 2009, where he won the FA Cup in 2011 and the Premier League title the following season. After a season on loan, he joined Everton on a three-year contract in July 2014, and on its expiration he signed for West Bromwich Albion, where he played until his retirement in 2020.

Barry is a former England international, having won his first full cap in 2000 and captained the side in 2010 in a friendly against Egypt. He earned 53 caps in total, scoring three goals, and was included in England's squads at UEFA Euro 2000 and the 2010 FIFA World Cup.

== Club career ==
=== Aston Villa ===
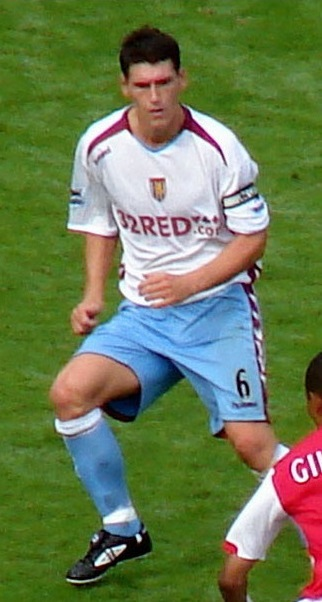
Gareth Barry playing for Aston Villa in August 2006

Barry joined Aston Villa from Brighton and Hove Albion as a trainee in 1997, along with Michael Standing. The move was controversial as both players were seen as future England internationals, with the Brighton board demanding significant compensation for both players. The Football Association's transfer tribunal panel ordered a compensation package which would have seen Brighton receive £1.025 million in the event of Barry making international appearances for England, as well as making sixty appearances for Villa.

Following a season in the reserves and academy sides he played his first senior match for Villa on 2 May 1998, a 3–1 win at Sheffield Wednesday, as a 49th-minute substitute for Ian Taylor. On 24 April 1999, on at half time for the injured Dion Dublin, he finished Steve Stone's cross 12 minutes later for his first professional goal, concluding a 2–0 win over Nottingham Forest at Villa Park. He started in the 2000 FA Cup Final at the old Wembley Stadium, which Villa lost 1–0 to Chelsea. In August 2001, he featured as Villa defeated FC Basel 5–2 on aggregate in the final of the 2001 UEFA Intertoto Cup.

In November 2007, it was reported that Aston Villa were set to award Barry a testimonial, at the age of just 26, to recognise his 10 years at the club. On 5 April 2008, Barry helped to break a run of bad form, scoring in a 4–0 victory over Bolton Wanderers. He scored two goals (his first two from open play that season) and he was also credited with two assists.

As of April 2008, Barry, approaching 400 total appearances for Aston Villa, was the longest serving player in the team. During the league game against Bolton Wanderers on 28 October 2007, Barry became the youngest player to appear in 300 Premier League games (aged 26 years 247 days), surpassing former record-holder Frank Lampard.

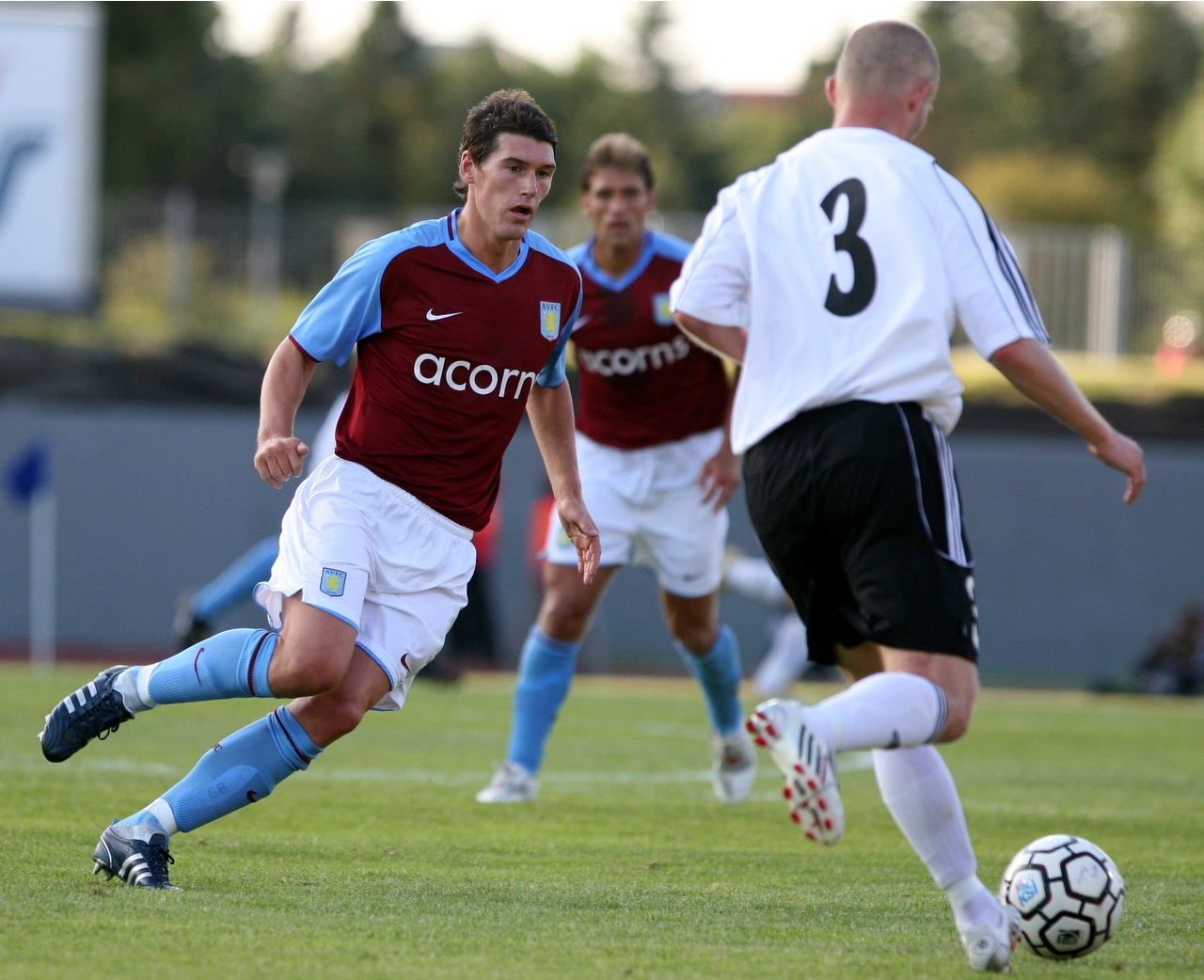
Barry in action against Icelandic club FH in 2008

In May 2008, Liverpool made a series of bids to buy Barry, all of which were rejected by Aston Villa. Barry publicly criticised his manager, Martin O'Neill, accusing him of making no attempt to keep him at the club, and further stating a desire to join Liverpool in order to compete in the Champions League. O'Neill denied this claim and Barry was officially disciplined for giving an unauthorised interview. A further bid from Liverpool of around £15 million was rejected as it was still short of Villa's £18 million asking price. Steve Finnan had then been offered in part-exchange in the deal, but the fee Villa wanted in this case was understood by BBC Sport to be £17 million with Finnan included. Barry was then stripped of the team captaincy, fined two weeks' wages and banned from training with the Villa squad.

He remained an Aston Villa player, starting in a UEFA Cup tie against Fimleikafélag Hafnarfjarðar, in which he scored in a 4–1 win. The goal against Hafnarfjordur was Barry's first European goal since he scored a penalty in the Intertoto Cup against Celta Vigo in 2000. On 18 September 2008, he made his 400th appearance in a Villa shirt in the UEFA Cup away to Litex Lovech, scoring a penalty as Villa won the match 3–1. Barry scored again for Villa as they beat Ajax 2–1 in their first UEFA Cup group match on 23 October 2008. Owing to the transfer saga, O'Neill had taken the captaincy away from him and handed it to centre-back Martin Laursen for the 2008–09 season. Following Laursen's injury, the captaincy was restored to Barry in January 2009. In total, he made 441 appearances for Aston Villa, scoring 52 goals in the process.

=== Manchester City ===
On 2 June 2009, Barry signed a five-year contract with Manchester City for a fee of £12 million and wore the number 18 shirt. Many Aston Villa fans publicly criticised Barry for this move considering his alleged desire to play in the UEFA Champions League. However, Barry responded to this positively and wrote a letter to the Birmingham Mail in which he thanked the Villa fans for their support while he was there, claiming that his move to City was for a "new challenge". He made his debut for City in the opening league game of the season against Blackburn Rovers at Ewood Park, playing the full 90 minutes in a 2–0 victory.

Barry scored his first Premier League goal for City against Manchester United at Old Trafford on 20 September 2009 levelling the scores at 1–1, but City went on to lose the match 4–3. Three days later, he scored a header in a League Cup tie with Fulham to make the scores 1–1 and City went on to win in extra time. On 16 February 2010, a week before his 29th birthday he played the full 90 minutes and scored a late equaliser in a 1–1 draw against Stoke City at the Britannia Stadium. Barry started the 2011 FA Cup Final as City defeated Stoke 1–0.

Barry scored his first goal of the 2011–12 season on 21 August in a 3–2 win against Bolton Wanderers. On 3 January 2012 he was sent off for the first time since joining Manchester City, in a 3–0 league win against Liverpool. Barry made 34 Premier League appearances in the 2011–12 season as Manchester City won the league title, the club's first in 44 years. On 11 December 2012, Barry was charged with misconduct by the Football Association, and two days later he was fined £8,000 and banned for one match for the offence, having verbally abused a match official.

=== Everton ===
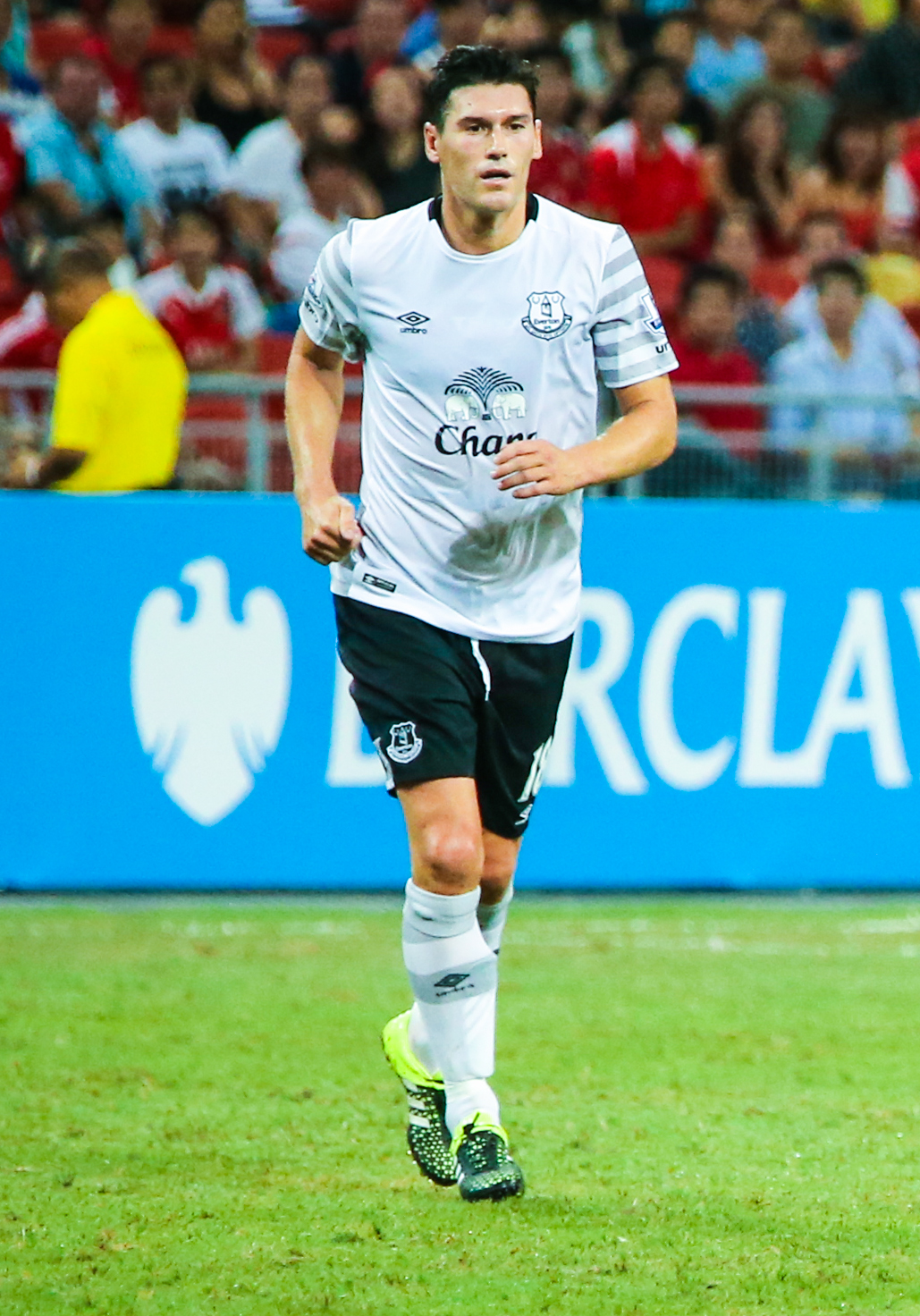
Gareth Barry playing for Everton in 2015

On 2 September 2013, transfer deadline day, Barry was loaned to Everton in a season-long deal. He made his debut on 15 September in a 1–0 home league win against Chelsea during which he made a block on Samuel Eto'o which prevented a certain goal, later being named man of the match. Later in the month Barry became the 10th player in Premier League history to make 500 career appearances in a 3–2 win over Newcastle United. He scored his first goal for the club in a 2–1 victory over Hull City on 19 October; the goal was originally awarded to Kevin Mirallas; however, the goals panel ruled that en route to the goal, Barry was deemed to have got the last touch on the ball before it beat Hull keeper Allan McGregor. He scored a long range effort in a 2–0 victory against Norwich City on 11 January 2014. He became a mainstay in Everton's midfield during the season and forged a partnership with James McCarthy. Barry completed the most passes of any Everton player during his spell as he helped the club amass a club record of 72 Premier League points to finish fifth. Barry was booked 10 times during the season to have the worst disciplinary record at the club.

On 8 July 2014, following his successful loan spell at Goodison Park, Barry completed a permanent move to Everton, signing a three-year deal having been released by Manchester City following the expiry of his contract. On 26 December, he was booked for a foul on Steven Nzonzi in a 1–0 home loss to Stoke City, making him the first player to receive 100 yellow cards in the Premier League era. Barry was sent off with two minutes remaining away to Chelsea on 11 February 2015 for a foul on Willian, causing a melée in which he was confronted by Branislav Ivanović; the game was scoreless at the incident and Everton eventually lost 1–0.

Barry was sent off in added time at the end of a 2–1 loss at Arsenal on 24 October 2015, receiving a second yellow card for a foul on Kieran Gibbs. Following Everton's 2–1 win over Manchester City in the first leg of the League Cup semi-final on 6 January 2016, manager Roberto Martínez described Barry as "one of the best English players ever." On 12 March 2016 in a 2–0 win over Chelsea in the FA Cup quarter-final, Barry was booked for a confrontation with Diego Costa, who was given a second yellow card for his part and sent off. Barry, who was later sent off himself, denied suggestions that he had been bitten on the neck by his opponent. Facing Sunderland in May 2016, he set a new record by starting a Premier League game for the 572nd time.

Barry became the third player (after Ryan Giggs and Frank Lampard) to make 600 Premier League appearances when he played against Middlesbrough on 17 September 2016, and equalised from a corner-kick routine in a 3–1 victory.

=== West Bromwich Albion ===
On 15 August 2017, Barry signed for fellow Premier League side West Bromwich Albion for an undisclosed fee. Four days later he made his debut for the Baggies in a 1–0 win at Burnley and manager Tony Pulis praised him as "absolutely fantastic". On 25 September, Barry captained West Brom as he made his 633rd Premier League appearance, beating Ryan Giggs' record of 632, in a 2–0 loss to Arsenal at the Emirates Stadium. At the time of breaking the record, Barry was eighth in English top-flight appearances since the Second World War.

After an injury brought his 2018–19 season to a premature end, Barry was released by West Brom in July 2019. After he recovered, the club expressed interest in re-signing him in October 2019, but a clause in his previous deal meant his former club, Everton, would be due a further payment if he received a contract extension. He was eventually re-signed on 4 November 2019 until the end of the 2019–20 season.

=== Retirement and veterans' football ===
Barry announced his retirement from football on 27 August 2020. He continued to make appearances for Kidderminster-based over 35s team Comberton Dynamoes Veterans after the end of his professional playing career.

=== Hurstpierpoint ===
In July 2024, Barry joined Hurstpierpoint of the Mid Sussex League Championship, which sits at the 12th tier of the English football pyramid. Barry made his debut for Hurstpierpoint away to Eastbourne Rangers on 8 February 2025. He scored his first goal for the club in a 2–2 draw against Polegate Town on 1 March. Barry did not return for the 2025–26 season.

== International career ==
Barry first represented England at under-16 level, and also played for the under-18s. He made his England under-21 debut against the Czech Republic in 1998, and made 27 appearances for the under-21 side between 1998 and 2003. This was a record at the time, though has since been surpassed.

Barry was first picked for the senior England side by Kevin Keegan. After an injury to Jason Wilcox, he travelled to UEFA Euro 2000, but did not feature in any of the side's games. Barry made his England debut as a substitute in a pre-Euro 2000 friendly against Ukraine on 31 May 2000. His first start for England was in the 1–1 draw against France on 2 September 2000. He appeared as a half-time substitute in England's first 2002 FIFA World Cup qualifier against Germany in the final match played at the old Wembley Stadium. After the resignation of Keegan, Barry was selected to start at left-back in England's next qualifier away in Finland by caretaker coach Howard Wilkinson.

After Sven-Göran Eriksson's appointment, Barry returned to play for the England under-21 team. The emergence of Ashley Cole and Wayne Bridge as England's first- and second-choice left-backs restricted Barry's chances of a recall; however, he was named in May 2003 in England's squad to play friendly matches against South Africa and Serbia & Montenegro, making a late substitute appearance in both matches.

On 2 February 2007, Barry was recalled to the England squad, following a four-year international exile, by Eriksson's replacement Steve McClaren. The midfielder had been resigned to never winning another cap under Eriksson. He was brought on at the beginning of the second half of the friendly match against Spain five days later, as substitute for Steven Gerrard, and played left midfield for the majority of the game, moving to left-back when Stewart Downing was brought on; England lost 1–0. On 25 May, Barry played for England B in a 3–1 victory over Albania, getting an assist for England's first goal scored by Alan Smith.

In August 2007, Barry became one of the few players to represent England at both the old and new Wembley Stadiums by coming on as a substitute, replacing Michael Carrick in a friendly against Germany.

Barry started in central midfield for England against Israel on 8 September 2007, as a replacement for the injured Owen Hargreaves, and recorded two assists. He kept his place with Hargreaves declared unfit for the match against Russia on 12 September 2007, and produced another impressive display. BBC pundits Ian Wright and Alan Shearer commented that Barry was immense in the centre of midfield alongside Gerrard, forming a wonderful partnership together, and further commented that he should have been made man of the match overall for the two performances against Israel and Russia.

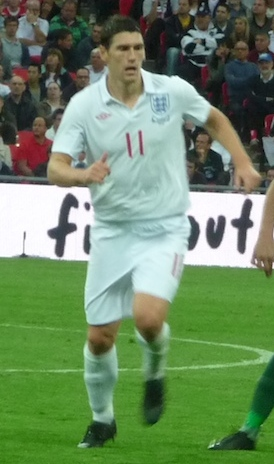
Barry playing for England in September 2009

He was also given the official man of the match for England's UEFA Euro 2008 home qualifier against Estonia. He was selected to start against Switzerland on 6 February 2008, England's first match under new coach Fabio Capello. He was again selected to start in England's friendly away to France on 26 March 2008. Barry scored his first international goal against Trinidad and Tobago on 1 June 2008; this completed a personal treble for Barry, as he also captained England in the second half of his 20th cap.

He appeared in every one of England's ten games during the 2008–09 season up until the game against Andorra on 10 June 2009, for which he was suspended, having picked up yellow cards in the games against Ukraine and Kazakhstan. In the game against Kazakhstan on 6 June, he scored his second international goal on his 13th cap, heading home a cross from Steven Gerrard.

Playing for England in a friendly against Egypt at Wembley, Barry was handed the captaincy in a game that they won 3–1, with his then Manchester City teammate Shaun Wright-Phillips on the scoresheet. However, an ankle injury picked up while playing for Manchester City made him uncertain for the 2010 FIFA World Cup, yet he was included in the 23-man England squad for the tournament. He missed the first game but played in the remaining three games for England, including the full 90 minutes of the second-round 4–1 defeat against Germany in Bloemfontein, which sent England out of the competition.

On 9 February 2011, he was again made captain for the final 10 minutes of the match against Denmark, after Frank Lampard and Ashley Cole had already worn the skipper's armband. On 29 March 2011, Barry skippered England against Ghana in a friendly match at Wembley in a 1–1 draw. On 4 June 2011, he was an unused substitute against Switzerland in a Euro 2012 qualifier at Wembley in a 2–2 draw. On 12 November 2011, he earned his 50th cap for England in the 1–0 win over Spain in a friendly after coming on as a substitute.

On 15 November 2011, Barry scored England's 2,000th international goal in a 1–0 friendly win over Sweden.

Barry was called into the England squad for UEFA Euro 2012 but ruled out of the tournament after picking up a groin injury. He was forced off less than 30 minutes after being introduced as a half-time substitute in the pre-tournament friendly against Norway in Oslo on 26 May 2012.

== Personal life ==
Barry married his childhood sweetheart Louise in the summer of 2007.

Barry is a close friend of Michael Standing, who signed for Aston Villa on the same day as him from Brighton in 1997. The pair have known each other since they were both ten years old. In 2009, Barry appointed Standing as his new agent after terminating his partnership with previous agent Alex Black.

Barry's nephew, Bradley Barry, is also a professional footballer.

In July 2018, his brother Marc died in a vehicle incident in Sussex, aged 38. Barry's father later said: "We are all totally devastated that Marc has been taken away from us in the prime of his life."

Barry has played for Temple Grafton Cricket Club in the Cotswold Hills League since 2019.

== Career statistics ==
=== Club ===
Appearances and goals by club, season and competition
Club	Season	League			FA Cup		League Cup		Europe		Other		Total	
Club	Season	Division	Apps	Goals	Apps	Goals	Apps	Goals	Apps	Goals	Apps	Goals	Apps	Goals
Aston Villa	1997–98	Premier League	2	0	0	0	0	0	0	0	—		2	0
Aston Villa	1998–99	Premier League	32	2	2	0	0	0	3 (Note: Appearances in UEFA Cup)	0	—		37	2
Aston Villa	1999–2000	Premier League	30	1	6	0	8	0	—		—		44	1
Aston Villa	2000–01	Premier League	30	0	3	0	1	0	4 (Note: Appearances in UEFA Intertoto Cup)	1	—		38	1
Aston Villa	2001–02	Premier League	20	0	1	0	0	0	7 (Note: Six appearances in UEFA Intertoto Cup, one appearance in UEFA Cup)	0	—		28	0
Aston Villa	2002–03	Premier League	35	3	1	0	4	1	4	0	—		44	4
Aston Villa	2003–04	Premier League	36	3	1	1	6	0	—		—		43	4
Aston Villa	2004–05	Premier League	34	7	1	1	1	0	—		—		36	8
Aston Villa	2005–06	Premier League	36	3	3	1	3	2	—		—		42	6
Aston Villa	2006–07	Premier League	35	8	1	0	3	1	—		—		39	9
Aston Villa	2007–08	Premier League	37	9	1	0	2	0	—		—		40	9
Aston Villa	2008–09	Premier League	38	5	1	0	1	0	8 (Note: One appearance in UEFA Intertoto Cup, seven appearances in UEFA Cup)	3	—		48	8
Aston Villa	Total		365	41	21	3	29	4	26	4	—		441	52
Manchester City	2009–10	Premier League	34	2	3	0	6	1	—		—		43	3
Manchester City	2010–11	Premier League	33	2	7	0	0	0	7 (Note: Appearances in UEFA Europa League)	0	—		47	2
Manchester City	2011–12	Premier League	34	1	0	0	2	0	7 (Note: Four appearances in UEFA Champions League, three in UEFA Europa League)	0	1 (Note: Appearance in FA Community Shield)	0	44	1
Manchester City	2012–13	Premier League	31	1	5	1	1	0	4 (Note: Appearances in UEFA Champions League)	0	0	0	41	2
Manchester City	Total		132	6	15	1	9	1	18	0	1	0	175	8
Everton (loan)	2013–14	Premier League	32	3	4	0	1	0	—		—		37	3
Everton	2014–15	Premier League	33	0	2	0	0	0	9	0	—		44	0
Everton	2015–16	Premier League	33	0	2	0	4	0	—		—		39	0
Everton	2016–17	Premier League	33	2	1	0	0	0	—		—		34	2
Everton	2017–18	Premier League	0	0	0	0	0	0	1	0	—		1	0
Everton	Total		131	5	9	0	5	0	10	0	—		155	5
West Bromwich Albion	2017–18	Premier League	25	1	3	0	1	0	—		—		29	1
West Bromwich Albion	2018–19	Championship	24	1	0	0	2	0	—		0	0	26	1
West Bromwich Albion	2019–20	Championship	3	0	3	0	0	0	—		—		6	0
West Bromwich Albion	Total		52	2	6	0	3	0	—		0	0	61	2
Hurstpierpoint	2024–25	Mid Sussex League Championship	2	1	0	0	—		—		0	0	2	1
Career total			682	55	51	4	46	5	54	4	1	0	834	68

=== International ===
International statistics
National team	Year	Apps	Goals
England	2000	6	0
England	2001	0	0
England	2002	0	0
England	2003	2	0
England	2004	0	0
England	2005	0	0
England	2006	0	0
England	2007	8	0
England	2008	10	1
England	2009	9	1
England	2010	9	0
England	2011	7	1
England	2012	2	0
Total		53	3

England score listed first, score column indicates score after each Barry goal.

International goals by date, venue, cap, opponent, score, result and competition
No.	Date	Venue	Opponent	Score	Result	Competition
1.	1 June 2008	Hasely Crawford Stadium, Port of Spain, Trinidad and Tobago	Trinidad and Tobago	1–0	3–0	Friendly
2.	6 June 2009	Almaty Central Stadium, Almaty, Kazakhstan	Kazakhstan	1–0	4–0	2010 FIFA World Cup qualification
3.	15 November 2011	Wembley Stadium, London, United Kingdom	Sweden	1–0	1–0	Friendly

== Honours ==
Aston Villa

- UEFA Intertoto Cup: 2001
- FA Cup runner-up: 1999–2000

Manchester City

- Premier League: 2011–12
- FA Cup: 2010–11; runner-up: 2012–13

Individual

- Everton Player of the Season: 2015–16
- Everton Players' Player of the Season: 2015–16

== Records ==
Barry held the record for the most appearances in the Premier League with 653, accumulated across spells at Aston Villa (365), Manchester City (132), Everton (131), and West Bromwich Albion (25) between 1998 and 2018. He surpassed Ryan Giggs' previous record of 632 on 25 September 2017, during West Bromwich Albion's 2–0 defeat to Arsenal. Among his other notable Premier League achievements, he became the youngest player to reach 300 appearances (aged 26 years and 247 days), achieving the milestone on 7 October 2007 for Aston Villa against Bolton Wanderers. He was also the first player to receive 100 yellow cards in the Premier League era, on 26 December 2014 for Everton against Stoke City, and reached a record of 122 in total. Barry reached 600 Premier League appearances on 17 September 2016, becoming the third player to do so (after Ryan Giggs and Frank Lampard), and scored in that match, a 3–1 win for Everton against Middlesbrough.

His appearances record was later surpassed by James Milner on 21 February 2026, although Barry still holds the record for the most Premier League starts (618), and the most minutes played in the competition, with 54,439.
