= Adam Marsh (footballer) =

English footballer (born 1982)

Personal information
- Date of birth: 20 February 1982 (age 44)
- Place of birth: Derby, England
- Position: Midfielder

Senior career*
Years	Team	Apps	(Gls)
–2000	Worksop Town		
2000–2001	Darlington	8	(0)
2001–2002	Whitby Town		
2002	Hampton & Richmond		
- * Club domestic league appearances and goals

Adam Marsh (born 20 February 1982) is an English former professional footballer who played in The Football League for Darlington.
