= Fabio Ferraresi =

Italian footballer

Personal information
- Date of birth: 24 May 1979 (age 47)
- Place of birth: Fano, Italy
- Height: 1.81 m (5 ft 11 in)
- Position: Midfielder

Youth career
- 1997–1998: Cesena

Senior career*
Years	Team	Apps	(Gls)
1998–1999	Aston Villa	0	(0)
1999–2001	Chievo	5	(0)
2000–2001	Lecco	30	(0)
2001–2003	Castel di Sangro	39	(1)
2003–2004	Avellino	26	(1)
2004–2005	Sora	30	(2)
2005–2006	Sangiovannese	3	(0)
2006	→ Martina (loan)	11	(2)
2006–2007	Chiasso	11	(1)
2007	→ Martina (loan)	8	(0)
2007–2009	Pescara	60	(3)
2009–2010	Valle del Giovenco	18	(1)
2010–2011	Lecco	18	(0)
2011–2013	Renato Curi Angolana	2	(0)
Total		261	(11)

Managerial career
- 2013–2016: Pescara (youth)
- 2016–2017: Castelfidardo (assistant)
- 2017–2018: Francavilla (youth)
- 2018–2019: Francavilla (assistant)
- * Club domestic league appearances and goals

Fabio Ferraresi (born 24 May 1979) is an Italian football coach and a former player.

== Career ==
Before the 1998–99 season, he was signed by Aston Villa and appeared in several pre-season friendlies. It was noted during this time that he was notable for his ungentlemanly play-acting and gesticulative behaviour.

He failed to make an impression on the Villa management and made a single competitive appearance for the club during a 3–0 away win against Strømsgodset Toppfotball during the UEFA Cup first round on 29 September 1998.

He left Aston Villa in January 1999.

In July 2009, he was signed by Valle del Giovenco.
