= Lee Hendrie =

English footballer

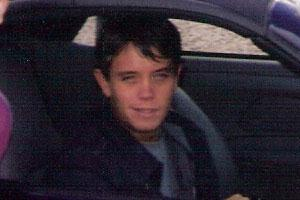
- Hendrie in 2000

Personal information
- Full name: Lee Andrew Hendrie
- Date of birth: 18 May 1977 (age 49)
- Place of birth: Kingshurst, Solihull, England
- Height: 5 ft 10 in (1.78 m)
- Position: Midfielder

Youth career
- 1993–1994: Aston Villa

Senior career*
Years	Team	Apps	(Gls)
1994–2007	Aston Villa	251	(27)
2006–2007	→ Stoke City (loan)	28	(3)
2007–2009	Sheffield United	17	(1)
2008	→ Leicester City (loan)	9	(1)
2008	→ Blackpool (loan)	6	(0)
2009–2010	Derby County	9	(0)
2010	→ Brighton & Hove Albion (loan)	8	(0)
2010	Bradford City	12	(2)
2011	Bandung	16	(3)
2011	Daventry Town	2	(0)
2011–2012	Kidderminster Harriers	15	(0)
2012	Chasetown	2	(0)
2012	Redditch United	6	(3)
2012–2013	Tamworth	27	(3)
2013	Corby Town	3	(0)
2013	Highgate United	2	(1)
2013–2015	Basford United		
2016	Redditch United	1	(0)
2019	Nuneaton Griff	3	(0)
2019	Highgate United	1	(0)
Total		431	(52)

International career
1996–2000	England U21	12	(5)
1998	England B	1	(0)
1998	England	1	(0)
- * Club domestic league appearances and goals

Lee Andrew Hendrie (born 18 May 1977) is an English former professional footballer and pundit for Sky Sports.

As a player, he was a midfielder who notably played in the Premier League for Aston Villa where he spent fourteen years. He also played for the England U21 and England B sides, and earned one full cap for England in 1998. He has also played in Football League for Stoke City, Sheffield United, Leicester City, Derby County, Brighton & Hove Albion. and Bradford City.

Following a spell in Indonesia with Bandung, he became a journeyman in non-league football, playing for Daventry Town, Kidderminster Harriers, Chasetown, Redditch United, Tamworth, Corby Town, Highgate United, Basford United, Nuneaton Griff, and Gloucestershire based Montpellier FC.

== Playing career ==
=== Aston Villa ===
Born in Solihull, Hendrie was red carded on his debut as a 17-year-old for Aston Villa as a substitute in a 1–0 defeat at Queens Park Rangers on 23 December 1995. He went on to achieve the accolade of the club's "Young Player of the Season" award in the 1997–98 season. Whilst at Aston Villa he played in the 2000 FA Cup Final.

After losing his place in the Villa team during the 2005–06 season, it seemed Hendrie's long spell at Villa Park was coming to an end, with Portsmouth reportedly showing an interest in his services. On 29 September, he joined Stoke City on loan, on the recommendation of his father. On 30 January 2007, he extended his loan spell with the Potters until the end of the 2006–07 season. He played 28 times for Stoke scoring three goals which came against Leeds United, Sunderland and Norwich City.

During Hendrie's time with Villa, he crashed his Porsche as he tried to make a plane for a European game and his manager Graham Taylor had to deal with other disciplinary matters.

=== Sheffield United ===
Hendrie signed a three-year contract with Sheffield United after arriving on a free transfer in July 2007, making his debut on the opening day of the season, a 2–2 home draw with Colchester United. However, he was dogged by injuries for the first half of the season. Hendrie scored his first goal for the Blades in a 5–0 win over Morecambe in the League Cup in September 2007, but was unable to hold down a regular first-team place as the club struggled in the bottom half of the table. He scored his first league goal for Sheffield United in a 2–1 win over Queens Park Rangers on 12 January 2008.

With the departure of Bryan Robson in February 2008, new manager Kevin Blackwell quickly allowed Hendrie to join Leicester City in an emergency loan deal, with a view to a permanent move. He scored the winning goal for Leicester in a 1–0 win over Scunthorpe United on 29 March 2008 but could not prevent the club's relegation to League One and he subsequently returned to Bramall Lane.

In November 2008, he joined Blackpool on loan initially until 1 January 2009, making his debut as a second-half substitute the same day in the West Lancashire derby at home to Preston North End at Bloomfield Road. He was sent off for Blackpool versus Reading on 9 December 2008 and returned to Sheffield United on 31 December 2008 having made six appearances.

Having returned to Bramall Lane once more he vowed to try to force his way into first team contention having been given a wake up call by his time at Blackpool. He made a number of further substitute appearances for The Blades up to the end of the season. Having been brought off the bench in the 85th minute of the play off final against Burnley at Wembley he was subsequently sent off after the final whistle had blown for directing foul language at referee Mike Dean. Following the Blades unsuccessful play off campaign Hendrie was placed on the transfer list as the club sought to cut its wage bill.

=== Derby County ===
On 1 September 2009, Hendrie joined Derby County in a swap deal that involved Jordan Stewart moving in the opposite direction. Partly due to injury, Hendrie made just five starts for Derby before he moved to Brighton & Hove Albion on loan for the rest of the season on 23 March 2010. It was announced on 13 May 2010, that he would leave Derby at the end of his contract after just 10 appearances from his nine months with the club.

=== Bradford City ===
Hendrie was set to join Scottish-side Aberdeen but the deal fell through at the last minute. Instead, he started training with Championship side Reading, but was not offered a contract and was instead offered a short-term deal at his cousin John Hendrie's former club Bradford City by manager Peter Taylor. Taylor had previously managed Hendrie for England under-21s. Talking about his signing and the short-term deal, Hendrie said: "These next few weeks will be very interesting for me, and I will knuckle down. I have to use this to build up my fitness and get back to my peak." On 1 January 2011 it was confirmed by Bradford manager Peter Taylor that Hendrie's deal would not be extended due to finances and that the player had in fact, left the club. Taylor said "I feel really sorry for him. He has been a superb professional during his time at the football club. Lee's a great lad, he's still a great player. We have a League Two budget and we could only take this deal so far". Hendrie had played 14 times for The Bantams and had scored twice.

Hendrie was offered a deal by Conference National side Mansfield Town but turned it down because of a better offer from Bandung, a club from Indonesian breakaway league, Liga Primer Indonesia.

=== Bandung ===
On 26 January 2011, Indonesian club Bandung announced the signing of Hendrie on a free transfer. Hendrie signed a two-year contract with the Indonesian outfit and was assigned the number 10 jersey. He was both the first Englishman and the first player with Premier League experience to sign for a Liga Primer Indonesia club. He made his debut on 5 February 2011 in a 1–0 defeat against Persema Malang. He scored his first goal for Bandung and provided an assist for Perry Somah on 12 February 2011 in a 3–2 defeat against Batavia Union. On 12 March 2011, he provided another assist for Somah in a 1–0 win against Minangkabau. It was Bandung's first win in the 2011 Liga Primer Indonesia. At the end of season, Hendrie was released from the club which then folded.

=== Non-league football ===
Throughout the summer of 2011, Hendrie joined a number of clubs for training and on trial. He was linked with a move to Wrexham but any hopes of that materialising broke down with manager Dean Saunders' departure to Doncaster Rovers. In July he joined Corby Town on a month's trial, however after just three weeks he left on his own accord. In late August, Hendrie agreed to train with Hinckley United, staying with the club for a month and playing in one friendly match at the start of October. Later that month, he signed for Daventry Town until the end of the season. Hendrie was signed by Daventry Town manager Mark Kinsella who was one of his former teammates at Aston Villa.

He made his debut for the club on 15 October 2011 in an FA Cup Third qualifying round match against Nuneaton Town. He played his first league game in a 2–0 loss against Uxbridge three days later. Hendrie's first win as a Daventry Town player came on 22 October as Kidsgrove Athletic were beaten 4–3 in the First qualifying round of the FA Trophy. Hendrie's younger brother, Stuart, joined him at Daventry on 21 October 2011, signing on a short-team loan deal from Hinckley United.

On 9 November 2011, Hendrie was unveiled by Kidderminster Harriers as having signed on non-contract terms. Allocated the number 34 shirt, he made his league debut on 26 November 2011 as a 60th-minute substitute in a 0–0 home draw with Cambridge United; he would go on to play in a further 14 league matches for Kidderminster before his release in March 2012. Immediately upon his release by Kidderminster, Hendrie signed for Northern Premier League Premier Division side Chasetown, returning to the lower levels of English non-league football after a 5-month absence. His Chasetown debut came in a 1–1 home draw with Matlock Town on 20 March 2012.

On 29 March 2012, Hendrie joined Southern League Premier club Redditch United, the club his father managed from 1991 to 1995, on a non-contract basis until the end of the season. Hendrie joined his brother Stuart at Redditch, the latter once again on loan from parent club Hinckley United.

Hendrie signed for Tamworth in the summer of 2012, taking the number 8 shirt; he made his debut for the club on 6 October 2012 as a 60th-minute substitute for George Baldock in a 2–1 home defeat to Newport County. He announced his retirement from the game in May 2013 to focus on his work as a director at FootieBugs, a football activity programme company for young children. He resumed his playing career in September 2013, joining Corby Town.

Hendrie soon moved on from Corby and on 3 December 2013, he played for Highgate United in their away Midland Football Alliance fixture against A.F.C. Wulfrunians. Hendrie scored and provided an assist on his début for the club in a 3–1 win. However, the club were quick to announce that Hendrie's appearance was only a "one-off" and that he had in fact signed for Nottinghamshire-based Basford United on 5 December. He remained dual-registered for Highgate, allowing him to potentially play for the club again (subject to his availability). He made a second appearance for the club two weeks later, on a night when Basford United did not have a fixture.

Hendrie scored on his début for Basford against Armthorpe Welfare. In April 2014 Hendrie stated he was a victim of forgery and that someone had falsified transfer documents claiming he was moving to Tavistock.

Hendrie left Basford United in October 2015. He subsequently played for Montpellier (based in Badsey), and all-conquering Sunday league club Digby Rangers from Birmingham before returning to Redditch United. He then signed for Nuneaton Griff, before returning to Highgate United.

== International career ==
Despite his Scottish and Irish parentage, Hendrie represented England, the country of his birth, at international level. He appeared twelve times for the England under-21 team, scoring five goals. Hendrie made a single appearance for the England B in April 1998, a 4-1 victory against Russia B a few months before the 1998 FIFA World Cup but was not selected for the final squad.

He won his only full international cap for England at the age of 21 as a late substitute on 18 November 1998 against the Czech Republic.

== Media career ==
Hendrie now works as a pundit for Sky Sports.

In 2019 and 2020, Hendrie featured in both seasons of ITV show Harry's Heroes, which featured former football manager Harry Redknapp attempting get a squad of former England international footballers back fit and healthy for a game against Germany legends. Hendrie gained extra praise for opening up on his struggles with mental health.

For Season Two of the Apple TV series Ted Lasso, assistant director Sophie Worger hired former professional player Kasali Casal to manage the soccer choreography. Casal enlisted a team of former professional players to play for the opposition teams facing AFC Richmond during game scenes, these included Hendrie and fellow former Premier League players and Jay Bothroyd, Jermaine Pennant, and George Elokobi.

== Personal life ==
Lee Hendrie is the son of Scottish former professional footballer Paul Hendrie. Paul Hendrie moved to England in March 1972 to join Birmingham City. Hendrie was born in Birmingham on 18 May 1977. His younger brother, Stuart Hendrie, is also a footballer, who played alongside him at Daventry Town. Hendrie is the cousin of another Scottish professional footballer, John Hendrie.

On 27 January 2012, Hendrie was declared bankrupt by Her Majesty's Revenue and Customs at the High Court. During this time, Hendrie twice tried to take his own life.

Aside from his playing career Hendrie is also a director of FootieBugs, a sister company of YogaBugs, which provides football-based activities and events for children aged 2 to 7.

== Career statistics ==
=== Club ===
Appearances and goals by club, season and competition
Club	Season	League			FA Cup		League Cup		Continental		Other		Total	
Club	Season	Division	Apps	Goals	Apps	Goals	Apps	Goals	Apps	Goals	Apps	Goals	Apps	Goals
Aston Villa	1995–96	Premier League	3	0	0	0	0	0	—		—		3	0
Aston Villa	1996–97	Premier League	4	0	3	0	0	0	0	0	—		7	0
Aston Villa	1997–98	Premier League	17	3	4	0	0	0	3 (Note: Appearances in UEFA Cup)	0	—		24	3
Aston Villa	1998–99	Premier League	32	3	2	0	0	0	3	0	—		37	3
Aston Villa	1999–2000	Premier League	29	1	4	0	5	3	—		—		38	4
Aston Villa	2000–01	Premier League	32	6	1	0	1	0	3 (Note: Appearances in UEFA Intertoto Cup)	0	—		37	6
Aston Villa	2001–02	Premier League	29	2	1	0	2	0	7 (Note: Six appearances and two goals in UEFA Intertoto Cup, one appearance in UEFA Cup)	2	—		39	4
Aston Villa	2002–03	Premier League	27	4	1	0	3	0	3	0	—		34	4
Aston Villa	2003–04	Premier League	32	2	1	0	4	0	—		—		37	2
Aston Villa	2004–05	Premier League	29	5	1	0	2	0	—		—		32	5
Aston Villa	2005–06	Premier League	16	1	2	0	1	0	—		—		19	1
Aston Villa	2006–07	Premier League	1	0	0	0	0	0	—		—		1	0
Aston Villa	Total		251	27	20	0	18	3	19	2	—		308	32
Stoke City (loan)	2006–07	Championship	28	3	0	0	0	0	—		—		28	3
Sheffield United	2007–08	Championship	12	1	1	0	1	1	—		—		14	2
Sheffield United	2008–09	Championship	5	0	4	1	2	1	—		1 (Note: Appearance in Championship play-offs)	0	12	2
Sheffield United	Total		17	1	5	1	3	2	—		1	0	26	4
Leicester City (loan)	2007–08	Championship	9	1	0	0	0	0	—		—		9	1
Blackpool (loan)	2008–09	Championship	6	0	0	0	0	0	—		—		6	0
Derby County	2009–10	Championship	9	0	1	0	0	0	—		—		10	0
Brighton & Hove Albion (loan)	2009–10	League One	8	0	0	0	0	0	—		—		8	0
Bradford City	2010–11	League Two	12	2	1	0	0	0	—		1 (Note: Appearance in Football League Trophy)	0	14	2
Bandung	2011	Liga Primer Indonesia	15	2	—		—		—		—		15	2
Daventry Town	2011–12	Southern League Division One Central	2	0	1	0	—		—		1 (Note: Appearance(s) in FA Trophy)	0	4	0
Kidderminster Harriers	2011–12	Conference Premier	15	0	0	0	—		—		0	0	15	0
Chasetown	2011–12	Northern Premier League Premier Division	2	0	0	0	—		—		0	0	2	0
Redditch United	2011–12	Southern League Premier Division	6	3	0	0	—		—		0	0	6	3
Tamworth	2012–13	Conference Premier	27	3	1	0	—		—		2	0	30	3
Corby Town	2013–14	Southern League Premier Division	3	0	5	0	—		—		1	0	9	0
Highgate United	2013–14	Midland Football Alliance	2	1	—		—		—		—		2	1
Basford United	2014–15	Midland League Premier Division	25	1	3	0	—		—		3 (Note: One appearance in FA Vase, one appearance in Midland League Premier Division Cup, one appearance one goal in Nottinghamshire Senior Cup)	1	31	12
Montpellier	2016–17	Midland League Division Three	13	8	—		—		—		5 (Note: One appearance in FA Vase, two appearances one goal in Midland League Les James Challenge Cup, two appearances in Worcestershire Junior Cup)	1	18	9
Redditch United	2016–17	Southern League Premier Division	1	0	—		—		—		—		1	0
Nuneaton Griff	2018–19	Midland League Division One	3	0	—		—		—		—		3	0
Highgate United	2018–19	Midland League Premier Division	1	0	—		—		—		1 (Note: Appearance in JW Hunt Cup)	0	2	0
Highgate United	2019–20	Midland League Premier Division	0	0	—		—		—		1 (Note: Appearance in Smedley Crooke Memorial Charity Cup)	0	1	0
Highgate United	Total		1	0	—		—		—		2	0	3	0
Career total			455	62	37	1	21	5	19	2	16	2	548	72

=== International ===
National team	Year	Apps	Goals
England	1998	1	0
Total		1	0

== Honours ==
Aston Villa

- UEFA Intertoto Cup: 2001
- FA Cup runner-up: 1999–2000

Individual

- Aston Villa Young Player of the Season: 1997–98
