= Adam Rachel =

English footballer and coach

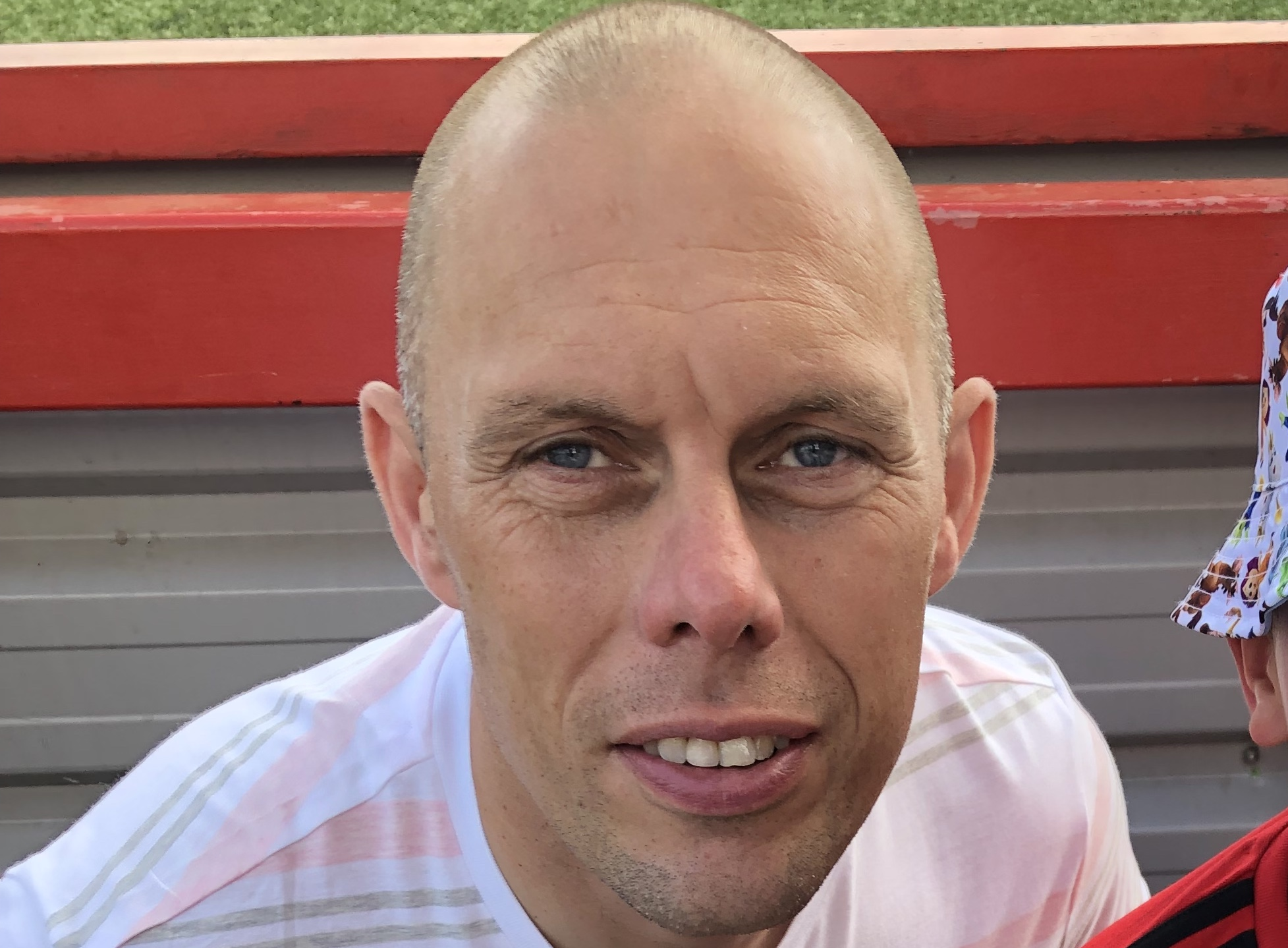
- Rachel in June 2019

Personal information
- Full name: Adam Charles Rachel
- Date of birth: 10 December 1976 (age 49)
- Place of birth: Birmingham, England
- Height: 5 ft 11 in (1.80 m)
- Position: Goalkeeper

Team information
- Current team: Tamworth (academy-coach)

Youth career
- Aston Villa

Senior career*
Years	Team	Apps	(Gls)
1996–1999	Aston Villa	1	(0)
1999–2001	Blackpool	1	(0)
2000	→ Northwich Victoria (loan)		
2001–2007	Moor Green		
2007–2011	Solihull Moors		

Managerial career
- 2019–: Tamworth (academy-coach)
- * Club domestic league appearances and goals as of 19 July 2019

Adam Rachel (born 10 December 1976) is an English former professional footballer, who currently is an academy coach National League side Tamworth. During his playing career he played as a goalkeeper.

== Playing career ==
=== Aston Villa ===
Rachel started his professional football career as a trainee with Aston Villa, turning professional in August 1996. He was mainly a reserve at Villa, making just one league appearance, against Blackburn Rovers on 26 December 1998 when he was a second-half substitute for Lee Hendrie after Villa keeper Michael Oakes had been sent off.

=== Blackpool ===
In September 1999, Rachel left Villa to join Blackpool on a free transfer. During his time with the Seasiders, he only made one appearance and was sent out on loan to Northwich Victoria in October 2000 before being released at the end of the season.

=== Moor Green/Solihull Moors ===
In July 2001 he joined Moor Green and although appearing less frequently due to increased work commitments, when Moor Green and Solihull Borough merged in the summer of 2007, Rachel joined the new Solihull Moors team.

Rachel remained at Solihull Moors until 23 November 2011, when it was announced he was to part ways with the club following 10 years' service. He had found first-team appearances very limited in the latter years due to concentrating on his coaching career.

== Coaching career ==
=== Tamworth ===
Adam, is a regular member of the academy coaching setup at Tamworth.
