= Lee Collins (footballer, born 1977) =

English footballer

Personal information
- Full name: Lee David Collins
- Date of birth: 10 September 1977 (age 49)
- Place of birth: Birmingham, England
- Position: Defender

Youth career
- Aston Villa

Senior career*
Years	Team	Apps	(Gls)
1995–1999	Aston Villa	0	(0)
1999–2001	Stoke City	4	(0)
2000	→ Cambridge United (loan)	0	(0)
2001	→ Moor Green (loan)		
2001–2007	Moor Green		
2007–2009	Solihull Moors		
2009–2010	Hinckley United		
- * Club domestic league appearances and goals

Lee David Collins (born 10 September 1977) is an English former footballer who played for Stoke City.

== Career ==
Collins was born in Birmingham started his football career back in 1995 with Aston Villa as a trainee. He moved to Stoke City in the summer of 1998. At Stoke, Collins made four appearances in 1998–99 but struggled to become a regular and spent the 1999–2000 season on loan at Cambridge United. He failed to make an appearance for Cambridge and after one FA Cup match in 2000–01 he was released by the club. He has spent the bulk of his career at Moor Green and stayed with them when the merged to form Solihull Moors where he was club captain. Collins moved to Hinckley United in July 2009.

== Personal life ==
He graduated from the University of Salford in 2007 with a degree in physiotherapy.

== Career statistics ==
Appearances and goals by club, season and competition
Club	Season	League			FA Cup		League Cup		Other^{[A]}		Total	
Club	Season	Division	Apps	Goals	Apps	Goals	Apps	Goals	Apps	Goals	Apps	Goals
Stoke City	1998–99	Second Division	4	0	0	0	0	0	0	0	4	0
Stoke City	1999–2000	Second Division	0	0	0	0	0	0	0	0	0	0
Stoke City	2000–01	Second Division	0	0	1	0	0	0	0	0	1	0
Career Total			4	0	1	0	0	0	0	0	5	0

A. The "Other" column constitutes appearances and goals in the Football League Trophy.
