= 2000–01 Aston Villa F.C. season =

English football club season

Aston Villa F.C.
2000–01 season
- Chairman: Doug Ellis
- Manager: John Gregory
- Stadium: Villa Park
- FA Premier League: 8th
- FA Cup: Fourth round
- League Cup: Third round
- UEFA Intertoto Cup: Semi-final
- Top goalscorer: League: Dion Dublin (8); All: Dion Dublin (9)
- Highest home attendance: 41,366 vs Liverpool (13 January 2001, FA Premier League)
- Lowest home attendance: 22,310 vs Bradford City (16 September 2000, FA Premier League)
- Average home league attendance: 31,597

The 2000–01 English football season was Aston Villa's 9th season in the Premier League and their 13th consecutive season in the top division of English football. Another season of decent (but rarely exciting) form saw Villa secure another top-10 finish, though this time they dipped slightly into eighth place after occupying sixth place a year earlier. Villa proved themselves as one of the hardest Premier League teams to beat, with only the top three sides suffering fewer defeats than Villa's 10, but a mere 13 wins and a staggering 15 draws ended any hopes of a title bid or even a top-six finish.

Juan Pablo Ángel (175) signed Villa on 12 January 2001, becoming the club's record signing at £9.5 million. Angel made his debut away to Manchester United in a 0–2 loss on 20 January 2001. Other debuts included Steve Staunton (208), Thomas Hitzlsperger (99), Alpay Özalan (58), David Ginola (41), Gilles De Bilde (4), and Luc Nilis (3).

Kit Supplier	Sponsor
<< Diadora	NTL

== Premier League ==
Pos	Team	Pld	W	D	L	GF	GA	GD	Pts	Qualification or relegation
6	Chelsea	38	17	10	11	68	45	+23	61	Qualification for the UEFA Cup first round (Note: Since Liverpool won the League Cup and qualified for the Champions League, their UEFA Cup place went to fifth-placed Ipswich Town. Since both FA Cup finalists, Liverpool and Arsenal, qualified for the Champions League, the berth in the UEFA Cup went to sixth-placed Chelsea. Both Ipswich and Chelsea were the highest-ranked team not already qualified for a European competition.)
7	Sunderland	38	15	12	11	46	41	+5	57	
8	Aston Villa	38	13	15	10	46	43	+3	54	Qualification for the Intertoto Cup third round
9	Charlton Athletic	38	14	10	14	50	57	−7	52	
10	Southampton	38	14	10	14	40	48	−8	52	

Source: Premier League
Rules for classification: 1) points; 2) goal difference; 3) number of goals scored.
Notes:

Results summary

Overall								Home						Away					
Pld	W	D	L	GF	GA	GD	Pts	W	D	L	GF	GA	GD	W	D	L	GF	GA	GD
38	13	15	10	46	43	+3	54	8	8	3	27	20	+7	5	7	7	19	23	−4

Source: 2000-01 FA Premier League table

Results by matchday

Match	1	2	3	4	5	6	7	8	9	10	11	12	13	14	15	16	17	18	19	20	21	22	23	24	25	26	27	28	29	30	31	32	33	34	35	36	37	38
Ground	A	H	A	A	H	A	H	A	H	H	A	H	A	A	H	A	H	A	H	A	H	A	H	A	H	A	A	H	H	A	H	H	H	A	H	A	H	A
Result	D	D	L	W	W	D	W	L	D	W	W	W	L	D	D	D	D	W	L	L	L	L	L	W	D	L	D	W	D	W	W	D	W	D	D	D	W	L
Position	10	17	19	13	7	9	5	6	11	7	5	4	5	6	7	8	9	7	9	11	13	13	13	12	13	14	14	12	12	11	10	8	8	7	7	8	8	8

Source: 11v11.com: 2000-01 Aston Villa results
A = Away; H = Home; W = Win; D = Draw; L = Loss

Win Draw Loss Fixtures

19 August 2000 1	Leicester City	0–0	Aston Villa
				Attendance: 21,455

27 August 2000 2	Aston Villa	1–1	Chelsea
	Nilis 10'			Attendance: 27,057

6 September 2000 3	Liverpool	3–1	Aston Villa
			Stone 83'	Attendance: 43,360

9 September 2000 4	Ipswich Town	1–2	Aston Villa
			Hendrie 28'; Dublin 54'	Attendance: 22,065

16 September 2000 5	Aston Villa	2–0	Bradford City
	Southgate 5'; Dublin 75' (pen.)			Attendance: 27,849

23 September 2000 6	Middlesbrough	1–1	Aston Villa
			Joachim 74'	Attendance: 27,556

30 September 2000 7	Aston Villa	4–1	Derby County
	Joachim 28'; Merson 37'; Wright 54'; Joachim 87'			Attendance: 26,534

14 October 2000 8	Arsenal	1–0	Aston Villa
				Attendance: 38,042

22 October 2000 9	Aston Villa	0–0	Sunderland
				Attendance: 27,215

28 October 2000 10	Aston Villa	2–1	Charlton Athletic
	Taylor 33'; Merson 41'			Attendance: 27,461

5 November 2000 11	Everton	0–1	Aston Villa
			Merson 90'	Attendance: 27,670

11 November 2000 12	Aston Villa	2–0	Tottenham Hotspur
	Taylor 22'; Taylor 57'			Attendance: 33,608

18 November 2000 13	Southampton	2–0	Aston Villa
				Attendance: 14,979

25 November 2000 14	Coventry City	1–1	Aston Villa
			Dublin 8'	Attendance: 21,464

2 December 2000 15	Aston Villa	1–1	Newcastle United
	Dublin 4'			Attendance: 34,255

9 December 2000 16	West Ham United	1–1	Aston Villa
			Hendrie 37'	Attendance: 25,888

16 December 2000 17	Aston Villa	2–2	Manchester City
	Dublin 71'; Ginola 86'			Attendance: 29,281

23 December 2000 18	Leeds United	1–2	Aston Villa
			Southgate 43'; Boateng 88'	Attendance: 39,714

26 December 2000 19	Aston Villa	0–1	Manchester United
				Attendance: 40,889

1 January 2001 20	Chelsea	1–0	Aston Villa
				Attendance: 33,159

13 January 2001 21	Aston Villa	0–3	Liverpool
				Attendance: 41,366

20 January 2001 22	Manchester United	2–0	Aston Villa
				Attendance: 67,533

24 January 2001 23	Aston Villa	1–2	Leeds United
	Merson 24'			Attendance: 29,335

3 February 2001 24	Bradford City	0–3	Aston Villa
			Vassell 50'; Vassell 58'; Joachim 87'	Attendance: 19,591

10 February 2001 25	Aston Villa	1–1	Middlesbrough
	Stone 38'			Attendance: 28,912

24 February 2001 26	Derby County	1–0	Aston Villa
				Attendance: 27,289

5 March 2001 27	Sunderland	1–1	Aston Villa
			Joachim 52'	Attendance: 47,196

10 March 2001 28	Aston Villa	2–1	Ipswich Town
	Joachim 53'; Joachim 71'			Attendance: 28,216

18 March 2001 29	Aston Villa	0–0	Arsenal
				Attendance: 36,111

31 March 2001 30	Manchester City	1–3	Aston Villa
	Merson 14'		Dublin 45'; Hendrie 65'	Attendance: 34,247

4 April 2001 31	Aston Villa	2–1	Leicester City
	Dublin 30'; Hendrie 72'			Attendance: 29,043

7 April 2001 32	Aston Villa	2–2	West Ham United
	Ginola 71'; Hendrie 78'			Attendance: 31,432

14 April 2001 33	Aston Villa	2–1	Everton
	Dublin 2'; Taylor 81'			Attendance: 31,272

17 April 2001 34	Charlton Athletic	3–3	Aston Villa
	Ginola 59'		Vassell 75'; Hendrie 90'	Attendance: 20,043

21 April 2001 35	Aston Villa	0–0	Southampton
				Attendance: 29,336

28 April 2001 36	Tottenham Hotspur	0–0	Aston Villa
				Attendance: 36,096

5 May 2001 37	Aston Villa	3–2	Coventry City
	Vassell 61'; Ángel 81'; Merson 86'			Attendance: 39,761
Note: Merson scores the Goal of the Month

19 May 2001 38	Newcastle United	3–0	Aston Villa
				Attendance: 51,506

== FA Cup ==
Round	Date	Opponent	Venue	Result	Attendance	Goalscorers
R3	7 January 2001	Newcastle United	A	1–1	37,682	Stone 54'
R3R	17 January 2001	Newcastle United	H	1–0	25,387	Vassell 50'
R4	27 January 2001	Leicester City	H	1–2	26,283	Joachim 76'

== League Cup ==
Round	Date	Opponent	Venue	Result	Attendance	Goalscorers
R3	1 November 2000	Manchester City	H	0–1	24,138	

== Intertoto Cup ==
Round	Date	Opponent	Venue	Result	Attendance	Goalscorers
R3 1st Leg	16 July 2000	FK Marila Příbram (Czech Republic)	A	0–0	7,852	
R3 2nd Leg	22 July 2000	FK Marila Příbram (Czech Republic)	H	3–1 (won 3–1 on agg)	8,200	Dublin 8', Taylor 56', Nilis 62'
SF 1st Leg	26 July 2000	Celta de Vigo (Spain)	A	0–1	14,000	
SF 2nd Leg	2 August 2000	Celta de Vigo (Spain)	H	1–2 (lost 1–3 on agg)	11,909	Barry (pen) 45'

== Players ==
=== First-team squad ===
#	Name	Position	Nationality	Place of birth	Date of birth (age)	Signed from	Date signed	Fee	Apps	Gls
Goalkeepers
1	David James	GK	(England)	Welwyn Garden City	1 August 1970 (aged 29)	Liverpool	17 June 1999	£1,700,000	39	0
13	Neil Cutler	GK	(England)	Perton	3 September 1976 (aged 23)	Chester City	30 November 1999	Free transfer	1	0
39	Peter Enckelman	GK	(Finland)	Turku	10 March 1977 (aged 23)	(Finland) TPS	1 February 1999	£200,000	14	0
40	Matthew Ghent	GK	(England)	Burton upon Trent	5 September 1980 (aged 19)	Academy	1 July 1997	—N/a	0	0
Defenders
2	Mark Delaney	RB	(Wales)	Haverfordwest	13 May 1976 (aged 24)	(Wales) Cardiff City	9 March 1999	£250,000	38	1
3	Alan Wright	LB	(England)	Ashton-under-Lyne	28 September 1971 (aged 28)	Blackburn Rovers	10 March 1995	£1,000,000	242	4
4	Gareth Southgate (c)	CB	(England)	Watford	3 September 1970 (aged 29)	Crystal Palace	1 July 1995	£3,500,000	207	7
5	Ugo Ehiogu	CB	(England)	Hackney	3 November 1972 (aged 27)	West Bromwich Albion	12 July 1991	£40,000	299	15
11*	Steve Staunton	LB	(Republic of Ireland)	Dundalk	19 January 1969 (aged 31)	Liverpool	6 December 2000	Free transfer	264	17
15	Gareth Barry	LB	(England)	Hastings	23 February 1981 (aged 19)	Academy	1 January 1998	—N/a	83	3
16	Alpay Özalan	CB	(Turkey)	İzmir	30 May 1973 (aged 27)	(Turkey) Fenerbahçe	28 July 2000	£5,600,000	-	-
23	Najwan Ghrayib	LB	(Israel)	Nazareth	30 January 1974 (aged 26)	(Israel) Hapoel Haifa	20 July 1999	£1,000,000	6	0
30	Jon Bewers	RB	(England)	Kettering	10 September 1982 (aged 17)	Academy	1 July 1999	—N/a	1	0
31	Jlloyd Samuel	LB	(Trinidad and Tobago)	San Fernando	29 March 1981 (aged 19)	Academy	1 January 1999	—N/a	10	0
32	Aaron Lescott	CB	(England)	Birmingham	2 December 1978 (aged 20)	Academy	1 July 1998	—N/a	1	0
Midfielders
6	George Boateng	CM	(Netherlands)	(Ghana) Nkawkaw	5 September 1975 (aged 24)	Coventry City	20 July 1999	£4,500,000	45	3
7	Ian Taylor	CM	(England)	Birmingham	4 June 1968 (aged 32)	Sheffield Wednesday	21 December 1994	£1,000,000	220	32
10	Paul Merson	AM	(England)	Harlesden	20 March 1968 (aged 32)	Middlesbrough	8 September 1998	£6,750,000	72	10
11	Alan Thompson	LM	(England)	Newcastle upon Tyne	22 December 1973 (aged 26)	Bolton Wanderers	5 June 1998	£4,500,000	55	5
14	David Ginola	LM	(France)	Gassin	25 January 1967 (aged 33)	Tottenham Hotspur	30 July 2000	£3,000,000	-	-
17	Lee Hendrie	RM	(England)	Solihull	18 May 1977 (aged 23)	Academy	1 July 1995	—N/a	109	10
18	Steve Stone	RM	(England)	Gateshead	20 August 1971 (aged 28)	Nottingham Forest	11 March 1999	£5,500,000	46	3
21	Thomas Hitzlsperger	LM	(Germany)	Munich	5 April 1982 (aged 18)	(Germany) Bayern Munich	5 August 2000	Free transfer	-	-
24	John McGrath	CM	(Republic of Ireland)	Limerick	27 March 1980 (aged 20)	Academy	1 July 1999	—N/a	0	0
27	Michael Standing	AM	(England)	Shoreham-by-Sea	20 March 1981 (aged 19)	Academy	1 July 1998	—N/a	0	0
28	Gavin Melaugh	CM	(Northern Ireland)	Derry	9 July 1981 (aged 18)	Academy	1 July 2000	—N/a	-	-
29	Stephen Cooke	CM	(England)	Walsall	15 February 1983 (aged 17)	Academy	1 July 2000	—N/a	-	-
Forwards
8	Juan Pablo Ángel	CF	(Colombia)	Medellín	24 October 1975 (aged 24)	(Argentina) River Plate	13 January 2001	£9,500,000	-	-
9	Dion Dublin	CF	(England)	Leicester	22 April 1969 (aged 31)	Coventry City	5 November 1998	£5,750,000	57	26
12	Julian Joachim	CF	(England)	Peterborough	20 September 1974 (aged 25)	Leicester City	24 February 1996	£1,890,000	146	36
19	Richard Walker	CF	(England)	Bloxwich	8 November 1977 (aged 22)	Academy	1 July 1997	—N/a	8	2
20	Luc Nilis	CF	(Belgium)	Hasselt	25 May 1967 (aged 33)	(Netherlands) PSV Eindhoven	1 July 2000	Free transfer	-	-
22	Darius Vassell	CF	(England)	Birmingham	13 June 1980 (aged 20)	Academy	1 January 1998	—N/a	28	2
25	Gilles De Bilde	CF	(Belgium)	Zellik	9 June 1971 (aged 29)	Sheffield Wednesday	3 January 2001	Loan	-	-
35	Neil Tarrant	CF	(Scotland)	(England) Darlington	24 June 1979 (aged 21)	(Scotland) Ross County	28 April 1998	£250,000	0	0

*squad number was re-used following a players departure.
Note: Stats and ages are correct as of July 1, 2000.

Squad at end of season

Note: Flags indicate national team as defined under FIFA eligibility rules; some limited exceptions apply. Players may hold more than one non-FIFA nationality.

No.	Pos.	Nation	Player
1	GK	ENG	David James
2	DF	WAL	Mark Delaney
3	DF	ENG	Alan Wright
4	DF	ENG	Gareth Southgate (captain)
6	MF	NED	George Boateng (Note: Boateng was born in Nkawkaw, Ghana, but also qualified to represent the Netherlands internationally and represented them at U-21 level before making his international debut for the Netherlands in November 2001.)
7	MF	ENG	Ian Taylor
8	FW	COL	Juan Pablo Ángel
9	FW	ENG	Dion Dublin
10	MF	ENG	Paul Merson
11	DF	IRL	Steve Staunton
12	FW	ENG	Julian Joachim

No.	Pos.	Nation	Player
14	MF	FRA	David Ginola
15	DF	ENG	Gareth Barry
16	DF	TUR	Alpay Özalan
17	MF	ENG	Lee Hendrie
18	MF	ENG	Steve Stone
19	FW	ENG	Richard Walker
21	MF	GER	Thomas Hitzlsperger
22	FW	ENG	Darius Vassell
24	MF	IRL	John McGrath
29	MF	ENG	Stephen Cooke
31	DF	ENG	Jlloyd Samuel (Note: Samuel was born in San Fernando, Trinidad and Tobago, but also qualified to represent England internationally and would represent them at U-21 level and be called up to senior team before switching his international allegiance to Trinidad and Tobago and making his international debut for Trinidad and Tobago in September 2009.)

=== Left club during season ===
Note: Flags indicate national team as defined under FIFA eligibility rules; some limited exceptions apply. Players may hold more than one non-FIFA nationality.

No.	Pos.	Nation	Player
5	DF	ENG	Ugo Ehiogu (to Middlesbrough)
11	MF	ENG	Alan Thompson (to Celtic)
19	FW	ENG	Richard Walker (on loan to Blackpool)
20	FW	BEL	Luc Nilis (retired)
23	DF	ISR	Najwan Ghrayib (to Hapoel Haifa)

No.	Pos.	Nation	Player
25	FW	BEL	Gilles De Bilde (to Sheffield Wednesday)
32	DF	ENG	Aaron Lescott (to Sheffield Wednesday)
35	FW	SCO	Neil Tarrant (Note: Tarrant was born in Darlington, England, but also qualified to represent Scotland internationally and represented them at U-21 level.) (on loan to York City)
40	GK	ENG	Matthew Ghent (to Lincoln City)

=== Reserve squad ===
Note: Flags indicate national team as defined under FIFA eligibility rules; some limited exceptions apply. Players may hold more than one non-FIFA nationality.

No.	Pos.	Nation	Player
27	MF	ENG	Michael Standing
28	MF	NIR	Gavin Melaugh
35	FW	SCO	Neil Tarrant
39	GK	FIN	Peter Enckelman
—	GK	ENG	Neil Cutler

No.	Pos.	Nation	Player
—	MF	SWE	David Curtolo
—	MF	NOR	Jone Samuelsen (on trial from Haugesund)
—	FW	ENG	Stephen Evans
—	FW	FIN	Ville Harittu (on trial from TPS)

=== Under-19s ===
The following players spent most of the season playing for the under-19s, but may have also appeared for the reserves or under-17s.

Note: Flags indicate national team as defined under FIFA eligibility rules; some limited exceptions apply. Players may hold more than one non-FIFA nationality.

No.	Pos.	Nation	Player
30	MF	ENG	Jon Bewers
—	GK	ENG	Boaz Myhill (Note: Myhill was born in Modesto, California, United States, but was raised in England from the age of 1, qualifying to represent any of the home nations. He represented England at U-17, U-18, and U-20 level before making his international debut for Wales in March 2008.)
—	DF	ENG	Rob Edwards (Note: Edwards was born in Madeley, England, and represented them at U-16 level, but also qualified to represent Wales internationally through his parents and would make his international debut for Wales in March 2003.)
—	DF	ENG	Liam Folds
—	DF	ENG	Danny Haynes
—	DF	ENG	Leon Hylton
—	DF	ENG	Danny Jackman
—	DF	ENG	Ben Willets
—	DF	IRL	Seán Dillon
—	MF	ENG	David Berks
—	MF	ENG	Alexis Nicolas (Note: Nicolas was born in Westminster, England, but also qualified to represent Cyprus internationally and represented them at U-21 level.)

No.	Pos.	Nation	Player
—	MF	ENG	Jay Smith
—	MF	IRL	Keith Fahey
—	MF	AUS	Andrew Packer (on trial)
—	FW	ENG	Mark DeBolla
—	FW	ENG	David Goldsmith
—	FW	ENG	Stefan Moore
—	FW	NED	Maiko Alberink (on trial from SV Zwolle)
—	FW	FIN	Jan Lomski (on trial)
—	MF		John Malpass
—			Adam A. Smith

=== Under-17s ===
The following players spent most of the season playing for the under-17s, but may have also appeared for the reserves or under-19s.

Note: Flags indicate national team as defined under FIFA eligibility rules; some limited exceptions apply. Players may hold more than one non-FIFA nationality.

No.	Pos.	Nation	Player
—	GK	IRL	Wayne Henderson
—	DF	ENG	Ryan Amoo
—	DF	ENG	David Andrewartha
—	DF	ENG	Stuart Bridges
—	DF	ENG	Scott Cormell
—	DF	ENG	Liam Ridgewell
—	DF	ENG	Cameron Stuart (Note: Stuart was born in York, England, but also qualified to represent Scotland internationally and represented them at U-18 level.)
—	DF	ENG	James O'Connor
—	DF	ENG	Andy Wells
—	DF	ENG	Oliver Williams
—	DF	IRL	Pierre Ennis
—	DF	SWE	Fredrik Stoor (on trial from Hammarby IF)
—	DF	NOR	Trond Erik Bertelsen (on trial from Haugesund)
—	MF	ENG	James Beaumont (on trial)
—	MF	ENG	James Pawley
—	MF	ENG	Joshua Walker (on trial from Manchester United)
—	MF	ENG	Peter Whittingham

No.	Pos.	Nation	Player
—	MF	SWE	Nadir Benchenaa (on trial from Hammarby IF)
—	MF	SWE	Acke Steen (on trial from Öster)
—	FW	ENG	Mark Atkinson
—	FW	ENG	Michael Husbands
—	FW	ENG	Lee McGuire
—	FW	ENG	Luke Moore
—	FW	IRL	Peter Hynes
—	MF		Adam Baptist
—	MF		Jamie Cunnington
—	MF		David Nolan
—			Colin Doyle (on trial)
—			Michael Johnson (on trial)
—			Robert Jones (on trial)
—			Danny Meade
—			Robert Milner (on trial)
—			Ryan Poole

=== Other players ===
The following players were signed to the club on unknown contractual terms, and did not appear for any team this season.

Note: Flags indicate national team as defined under FIFA eligibility rules; some limited exceptions apply. Players may hold more than one non-FIFA nationality.

No.	Pos.	Nation	Player
—	DF	WAL	Stuart Thornley (to Flexsys Cefn Druids)
—	MF	ENG	Lloyd Dyer
—	MF	ENG	Duncan McArthur (on trial from Hastings United)
—	MF	BRA	Fernando Pelado (on trial from Treviso)

No.	Pos.	Nation	Player
—	FW	HON	Milton Núñez (on trial from Sunderland)
—	DF		Wesley Meacham (to Bromsgrove Rovers)
—			Stuart Lewis

== Statistics ==
=== Starting 11 ===
Considering starts in all competitions

No.	Pos.	Nat.	Name	MS	Notes
1	GK	(England)	David James	46	
3	RB	(England)	Alan Wright	43	
16	CB	(Turkey)	Alpay Özalan	36	
4	CB	(England)	Gareth Southgate	36	
15	LB	(England)	Gareth Barry	36	
26	RM	(England)	Steve Stone	41	
7	CM	(England)	Ian Taylor	31	
6	CM	(Netherlands)	George Boateng	37	
10	LM	(England)	Paul Merson	45	
12	CF	(England)	Julian Joachim	13	Lee Hendrie has 29 starts
9	CF	(England)	Dion Dublin	35	

== Transfers ==
=== Transferred in ===
Date	Pos	Player	From	Fee
1 July 2000	CF	(Belgium) Luc Nilis	(Netherlands) PSV Eindhoven	Free transfer
28 July 2000	CB	(Turkey) Alpay Özalan	(Turkey) Fenerbahçe	£5,600,000
30 July 2000	LM	(France) David Ginola	Tottenham Hotspur	£3,000,000
5 August 2000	LM	(Germany) Thomas Hitzlsperger	(Germany) Bayern Munich	Free transfer
6 December 2000	LB	(Republic of Ireland) Steve Staunton	Liverpool	Free transfer
13 January 2001	CF	(Colombia) Juan Pablo Ángel	(Argentina) River Plate	£9,500,000
				£18,100,000

Record

=== Loaned in ===
Date	Pos	Player	From	Loan End
10 October 2000	CF	(Belgium) Gilles De Bilde	Sheffield Wednesday	3 January 2001

=== Transferred out ===
Date	Pos	Player	To	Fee
1 July 2000	CF	(Jamaica) Darren Byfield	Walsall	Free transfer
4 July 2000	RB	Steve Watson	Everton	£2,500,000
17 July 2000	CM	Mark Draper	Southampton	£1,250,000
9 August 2000	SS	(Italy) Benito Carbone	Bradford City	Free transfer
1 September 2000	LM	Alan Thompson	(Scotland) Celtic	£2,750,000
3 October 2000	LB	Aaron Lescott	Sheffield Wednesday	£100,000
20 October 2000	CB	Ugo Ehiogu	Middlesbrough	£8,000,000
2 December 2000	GK	Matthew Ghent	Lincoln City	Free transfer
24 January 2001	CF	(Belgium) Luc Nilis	Retired	—N/a
26 January 2001	CF	Mark DeBolla	Charlton Athletic	Free transfer
13 February 2001	LB	(Israel) Najwan Ghrayib	(Israel) Hapoel Haifa	£150,000
				£14,750,000

=== Loaned out ===
Date	Pos	Player	To	Loan End
19 October 2000	CF	(Scotland) Neil Tarrant	York City	19 December 2000
15 December 2000	GK	Neil Cutler	Oxford United	27 February 2001
7 February 2001	CF	Richard Walker	Blackpool	31 May 2001

=== Overall transfer activity ===
==== Expenditure ====
▼£18,100,000

==== Income ====
▲£14,750,000

==== Balance ====
▼£3,350,000
