= 2001–02 Aston Villa F.C. season =

English football club season

Aston Villa
2001–02 season
- Chairman: Doug Ellis
- Manager: John Gregory (until 24 January); John Deehan and Stuart Gray (caretakers); Graham Taylor (from 5 February)
- Stadium: Villa Park
- Premier League: 8th
- FA Cup: Third round
- League Cup: Fourth round
- Intertoto Cup: Winners
- UEFA Cup: First round
- Top goalscorer: League: Darius Vassell and Juan Pablo Ángel (12); All: Juan Pablo Ángel (16)
- Average home league attendance: 35,012

The 2001–02 English football season was Aston Villa's 10th season in the Premier League and their 14th consecutive season in the top division of English football. The Premier League was known as the FA Barclaycard Premiership for sponsorship reasons. Aston Villa's early season form was good and the Midlanders even went top briefly at the end of October, but followed that with a run of eleven games with only one win, falling out of the title race.

John Gregory announced his surprise resignation after four years as Villa manager on 24 January. A host of names were linked with the vacancy, but in the end it was Graham Taylor, who took Villa to promotion in 1988 and second place in the league in 1990, who was appointed manager. Taylor was unable to improve Villa's form, but two wins against Southampton and Chelsea at the end of the season where enough to see Villa finish eighth thus finishing in the top 10 for the seventh year in succession.

== Kit ==
| Kit Supplier | Sponsor |
|---|---|
| Diadora | NTL |

== Transfers ==
=== Transferred in ===
| Date | Pos | Player | From | Fee |
|---|---|---|---|---|
| 20 June 2001 | AM | (Morocco) Hassan Kachloul | Southampton | Free transfer |
| 7 July 2001 | LM | (Morocco) Mustapha Hadji | Coventry City | £4,500,000 |
| 12 July 2001 | GK | (Denmark) Peter Schmeichel | (Portugal) Sporting | Free transfer |
| 19 July 2001 | CB | (Sweden) Olof Mellberg | (Spain) Racing Santander | £5,000,000 |
| 24 August 2001 | CF | (Croatia) Boško Balaban | (Croatia) Dinamo Zagreb | £5,800,000 |
| 27 March 2002 | CF | Peter Crouch | Portsmouth | £5,000,000 |
| | | | | £20,300,000 |

=== Loaned in ===
| Date | Pos | Player | From | Loan End |

=== Transferred out ===
| Date | Pos | Player | To | Fee |
|---|---|---|---|---|
| 1 July 2001 | CM | (Sweden) David Curtolo | - | Released |
| 1 July 2001 | GK | Neil Cutler | Stoke City | Free transfer |
| 7 July 2001 | CF | Julian Joachim | Coventry City | £2,000,000 |
| 11 July 2001 | GK | David James | West Ham United | £3,500,000 |
| 11 July 2001 | CB | Gareth Southgate | Middlesbrough | £6,500,000 |
| 31 October 2001 | CF | (Scotland) Neil Tarrant | (Scotland) Ross County | Free transfer |
| 20 December 2001 | CF | Richard Walker | Blackpool | £50,000 |
| 8 February 2002 | LM | (France) David Ginola | Everton | Free transfer |
| 19 March 2002 | AM | Michael Standing | Bradford City | Free transfer |
| | | | | £12,050,000 |

=== Loaned out ===
| Date | Pos | Player | To | Loan End |
|---|---|---|---|---|
| 26 July 2001 | CF | (Scotland) Neil Tarrant | (Scotland) Motherwell | 31 October 2001 |
| 14 September 2001 | CF | Richard Walker | Wycombe Wanderers | 11 December 2001 |
| 25 October 2001 | LB | (Trinidad and Tobago) Jlloyd Samuel | Gillingham | 3 December 2001 |
| 26 October 2001 | LM | (Germany) Thomas Hitzlsperger | Chesterfield | 10 December 2001 |
| 9 March 2002 | CM | Stephen Cooke | Bournemouth | 21 April 2002 |
| 28 March 2002 | CF | Dion Dublin | Millwall | 31 May 2002 |

=== Overall transfer activity ===
==== Expenditure ====
▼£20,300,000

==== Income ====
▲£12,050,000

==== Balance ====
▼£8,250,000

== Squad ==
=== First Team ===
| # | Name | Position | Nationality | Place of birth | Date of birth (age) | Signed from | Date signed | Fee | Apps | Gls |
Goalkeepers
| 1 | Peter Schmeichel | GK | (Denmark) | Gladsaxe | 18 November 1963 (aged 37) | (Portugal) Sporting | 12 July 2000 | Free transfer | - | - |
| 12 | Peter Enckelman | GK | (Finland) | Turku | 10 March 1977 (aged 24) | (Finland) TPS | 1 February 1999 | £200,000 | 14 | 0 |
| 13 | Boaz Myhill | GK | (Wales) | (United States) Modesto, CA | 9 November 1982 (aged 18) | Academy | 1 July 2001 | —N/a | - | - |
| 39 | Wayne Henderson | GK | (Republic of Ireland) | Dublin | 16 September 1983 (aged 17) | Academy | 1 July 2001 | —N/a | - | - |
Defenders
| 2 | Mark Delaney | RB | (Wales) | Haverfordwest | 13 May 1976 (aged 25) | (Wales) Cardiff City | 9 March 1999 | £250,000 | 59 | 1 |
| 3 | Alan Wright | LB | (England) | Ashton-under-Lyne | 28 September 1971 (aged 29) | Blackburn Rovers | 10 March 1995 | £1,000,000 | 286 | 5 |
| 4 | Olof Mellberg | CB | (Sweden) | Gullspång | 3 September 1977 (aged 23) | (Spain) Racing Santander | 19 July 2001 | £5,000,000 | - | - |
| 5 | Alpay Özalan | CB | (Turkey) | İzmir | 30 May 1973 (aged 28) | (Turkey) Fenerbahçe | 28 July 2000 | £5,600,000 | 36 | 0 |
| 11 | Steve Staunton | LB | (Republic of Ireland) | Dundalk | 19 January 1969 (aged 32) | Liverpool | 6 December 2000 | Free transfer | 281 | 17 |
| 15 | Gareth Barry | LB | (England) | Hastings | 23 February 1981 (aged 20) | Academy | 1 January 1998 | —N/a | 121 | 4 |
| 25 | Jon Bewers | RB | (England) | Kettering | 10 September 1982 (aged 18) | Academy | 1 July 1999 | —N/a | 1 | 0 |
| 31 | Jlloyd Samuel | LB | (Trinidad and Tobago) | San Fernando | 29 March 1981 (aged 20) | Academy | 1 January 1999 | —N/a | 17 | 0 |
Midfielders
| 6 | George Boateng | CM | (Netherlands) | (Ghana) Nkawkaw | 5 September 1975 (aged 25) | Coventry City | 20 July 1999 | £4,500,000 | 86 | 4 |
| 7 | Ian Taylor | CM | (England) | Birmingham | 4 June 1968 (aged 33) | Sheffield Wednesday | 21 December 1994 | £1,000,000 | 255 | 36 |
| 10 | Paul Merson (c) | AM | (England) | Harlesden | 20 March 1968 (aged 33) | Middlesbrough | 8 September 1998 | £6,750,000 | 117 | 16 |
| 14 | David Ginola | LM | (France) | Gassin | 25 January 1967 (aged 34) | Tottenham Hotspur | 30 July 2000 | £3,000,000 | 28 | 3 |
| 17 | Lee Hendrie | RM | (England) | Solihull | 18 May 1977 (aged 24) | Academy | 1 July 1995 | —N/a | 146 | 16 |
| 18 | Steve Stone | RM | (England) | Gateshead | 20 August 1971 (aged 29) | Nottingham Forest | 11 March 1999 | £5,500,000 | 88 | 6 |
| 20 | Mustapha Hadji | LM | (Morocco) | Ifrane Atlas-Saghir | 16 November 1971 (aged 29) | Coventry City | 7 July 2001 | £4,500,000 | - | - |
| 21 | Thomas Hitzlsperger | LM | (Germany) | Munich | 5 April 1982 (aged 19) | (Germany) Bayern Munich | 5 August 2000 | Free transfer | 1 | 0 |
| 24 | John McGrath | CM | (Republic of Ireland) | Limerick | 27 March 1980 (aged 21) | Academy | 1 July 1999 | —N/a | 3 | 0 |
| 27 | Michael Standing | AM | (England) | Shoreham-by-Sea | 20 March 1981 (aged 20) | Academy | 1 July 1998 | —N/a | 0 | 0 |
| 28 | Gavin Melaugh | CM | (Northern Ireland) | Derry | 9 July 1981 (aged 19) | Academy | 1 July 2000 | —N/a | 0 | 0 |
| 29 | Stephen Cooke | CM | (England) | Walsall | 15 February 1983 (aged 18) | Academy | 1 July 2000 | —N/a | 1 | 0 |
| 30 | Hassan Kachloul | AM | (Morocco) | Agadir | 19 February 1973 (aged 28) | Southampton | 1 July 2001 | —N/a | - | - |
Forwards
| 8 | Juan Pablo Ángel | CF | (Colombia) | Medellín | 24 October 1975 (aged 25) | (Argentina) River Plate | 13 January 2001 | £9,500,000 | 10 | 1 |
| 9 | Dion Dublin | CF | (England) | Leicester | 22 April 1969 (aged 32) | Coventry City | 5 November 1998 | £5,750,000 | 97 | 35 |
| 16 | Peter Crouch | CF | (England) | Macclesfield | 30 January 1981 (aged 20) | Portsmouth | 27 March 2002 | £5,000,000 | - | - |
| 19 | Boško Balaban | CF | (Croatia) | Rijeka | 15 October 1978 (aged 22) | (Croatia) Dinamo Zagreb | 24 October 2001 | £5,800,000 | - | - |
| 22 | Darius Vassell | CF | (England) | Birmingham | 13 June 1980 (aged 21) | Academy | 1 January 1998 | —N/a | 58 | 7 |
| 23 | Stefan Moore | CF | (England) | Birmingham | 28 September 1983 (aged 17) | Academy | 1 July 2001 | —N/a | - | - |
| 26 | Richard Walker | CF | (England) | Birmingham | 8 November 1977 (aged 23) | Academy | 1 July 1997 | Loan | 10 | 2 |
| 42 | Peter Hynes | CF | (Republic of Ireland) | Dublin | 28 November 1983 (aged 17) | Academy | 1 July 2001 | —N/a | - | - |
| 44 | Neil Tarrant | CF | (Scotland) | (England) Darlington | 24 June 1979 (aged 22) | (Scotland) Ross County | 28 April 1998 | £250,000 | 0 | 0 |

Note: Stats and ages are correct as of July 1, 2001.

== Final league table ==
| Pos | Team | Pld | W | D | L | GF | GA | GD | Pts | Qualification or relegation |
|---|---|---|---|---|---|---|---|---|---|---|
| 6 | Chelsea | 38 | 17 | 13 | 8 | 66 | 38 | +28 | 64 | Qualification for the UEFA Cup first round (Note: Since Arsenal qualified for the Champions League, their UEFA Cup place as FA Cup winners defaulted to Chelsea, the losing finalists.) |
| 7 | West Ham United | 38 | 15 | 8 | 15 | 48 | 57 | −9 | 53 | |
| 8 | Aston Villa | 38 | 12 | 14 | 12 | 46 | 47 | −1 | 50 | Qualification for the Intertoto Cup third round |
| 9 | Tottenham Hotspur | 38 | 14 | 8 | 16 | 49 | 53 | −4 | 50 | |
| 10 | Blackburn Rovers | 38 | 12 | 10 | 16 | 55 | 51 | +4 | 46 | Qualification for the UEFA Cup first round (Note: Blackburn Rovers qualified for the UEFA Cup as League Cup winners.) |

Source: Premier League
Rules for classification: 1) points; 2) goal difference; 3) number of goals scored.
Notes:

Results summary

| Overall | | | | | | | | Home | | | | | | Away | | | | | |
| Pld | W | D | L | GF | GA | GD | Pts | W | D | L | GF | GA | GD | W | D | L | GF | GA | GD |
|---|---|---|---|---|---|---|---|---|---|---|---|---|---|---|---|---|---|---|---|
| 38 | 12 | 14 | 12 | 46 | 47 | −1 | 50 | 8 | 7 | 4 | 22 | 17 | +5 | 4 | 7 | 8 | 24 | 30 | −6 |

Source: 2001-02 Aston Villa Premier League Results

Results by matchday

| Match | 1 | 2 | 3 | 4 | 5 | 6 | 7 | 8 | 9 | 10 | 11 | 12 | 13 | 14 | 15 | 16 | 17 | 18 | 19 | 20 | 21 | 22 | 23 | 24 | 25 | 26 | 27 | 28 | 29 | 30 | 31 | 32 | 33 | 34 | 35 | 36 | 37 | 38 |
|---|---|---|---|---|---|---|---|---|---|---|---|---|---|---|---|---|---|---|---|---|---|---|---|---|---|---|---|---|---|---|---|---|---|---|---|---|---|---|
| Ground | A | H | A | H | A | H | H | A | H | H | A | H | A | H | A | A | H | A | H | H | A | H | A | H | A | H | A | H | A | H | A | A | H | A | H | A | H | A |
| Result | D | D | W | D | W | W | W | L | W | W | L | D | D | L | D | L | W | L | L | D | D | W | W | D | D | D | L | W | L | L | D | L | D | L | L | D | W | W |
| Position | 14 | 15 | 8 | 10 | 6 | 4 | 4 | 5 | 3 | 1 | 3 | 3 | 5 | 6 | 7 | 8 | 8 | 8 | 8 | 9 | 7 | 7 | 7 | 7 | 7 | 7 | 7 | 7 | 8 | 7 | 7 | 8 | 10 | 10 | 10 | 10 | 9 | 8 |

Source: 11v11.com: 2001-02 Aston Villa results
A = Away; H = Home; W = Win; D = Draw; L = Loss

== Results ==
Aston Villa's score comes first

=== Legend ===
| Win | Draw | Loss |

=== FA Premier League ===
| Date | Opponent | Venue | Result | Attendance | Scorers |
|---|---|---|---|---|---|
| 18 August 2001 | Tottenham Hotspur | A | 0–0 | 36,059 | |
| 26 August 2001 | Manchester United | H | 1–1 | 42,632 | Vassell 4' |
| 8 September 2001 | Liverpool | A | 3–1 | 44,102 | Dublin 31', Hendrie 55', Vassell 86' |
| 16 September 2001 | Sunderland | H | 0–0 | 31,668 | |
| 24 September 2001 | Southampton | A | 3–1 | 26,794 | Boateng 9', Ángel 15', Hadji 79' |
| 30 September 2001 | Blackburn Rovers | H | 2–0 | 27,732 | Ángel 46', Vassell 72' |
| 14 October 2001 | Fulham | H | 2–0 | 28,579 | Vassell 50', Taylor 61' |
| 20 October 2001 | Everton | A | 2–3 | 33,352 | Hadji 71', Schmeichel 90' |
| 24 October 2001 | Charlton Athletic | H | 1–0 | 27,701 | Kachloul 9' |
| 27 October 2001 | Bolton Wanderers | H | 3–2 | 33,599 | Ángel 13', (pen) 47', Vassell 43' |
| 3 November 2001 | Newcastle United | A | 0–3 | 51,057 | |
| 17 November 2001 | Middlesbrough | H | 0–0 | 35,424 | |
| 25 November 2001 | Leeds United | A | 1–1 | 40,159 | Kachloul 35' |
| 1 December 2001 | Leicester City | H | 0–2 | 30,711 | |
| 5 December 2001 | West Ham United | A | 1–1 | 28,377 | Dublin 1' |
| 9 December 2001 | Arsenal | A | 2–3 | 38,074 | Merson 21', Stone 34' |
| 17 December 2001 | Ipswich Town | H | 2–1 | 29,320 | Ángel 44', 70' |
| 22 December 2001 | Derby County | A | 1–3 | 28,001 | Ángel 45' |
| 26 December 2001 | Liverpool | H | 1–2 | 42,602 | Hendrie 21' |
| 29 December 2001 | Tottenham Hotspur | H | 1–1 | 41,134 | Ángel (pen) 90' |
| 1 January 2002 | Sunderland | A | 1–1 | 45,324 | Taylor 59' |
| 12 January 2002 | Derby County | H | 2–1 | 28,881 | Vassell 12', Ángel 26' |
| 21 January 2002 | Charlton Athletic | A | 2–1 | 25,681 | Vassell 8', Ángel 42' |
| 30 January 2002 | Everton | H | 0–0 | 32,460 | |
| 2 February 2002 | Fulham | A | 0–0 | 20,041 | |
| 9 February 2002 | Chelsea | H | 1–1 | 41,137 | Merson 28' |
| 23 February 2002 | Manchester United | A | 0–1 | 67,592 | |
| 2 March 2002 | West Ham United | H | 2–1 | 37,341 | Ángel 23', Vassell 90' |
| 5 March 2002 | Blackburn Rovers | A | 0–3 | 21,988 | |
| 17 March 2002 | Arsenal | H | 1–2 | 41,520 | Dublin 69' |
| 23 March 2002 | Ipswich Town | A | 0–0 | 25,247 | |
| 30 March 2002 | Bolton Wanderers | A | 2–3 | 24,600 | Warhurst (own goal) 15', Taylor 17' |
| 2 April 2002 | Newcastle United | H | 1–1 | 36,597 | Crouch 26' |
| 6 April 2002 | Middlesbrough | A | 1–2 | 26,003 | Ángel 60' |
| 13 April 2002 | Leeds United | H | 0–1 | 40,039 | |
| 20 April 2002 | Leicester City | A | 2–2 | 18,125 | Vassell 22', Hitzlsperger 27' |
| 27 April 2002 | Southampton | H | 2–1 | 35,255 | Vassell 8', 42' |
| 11 May 2002 | Chelsea | A | 3–1 | 40,709 | Crouch 21', Vassell 63', Dublin 88' |

=== FA Cup ===
| Round | Date | Opponent | Venue | Result | Attendance | Goalscorers |
|---|---|---|---|---|---|---|
| R3 | 6 January 2002 | Manchester United | H | 2–3 | 38,444 | Taylor 51', Neville (own goal) 53' |

=== League Cup ===
| Round | Date | Opponent | Venue | Result | Attendance | Goalscorers |
|---|---|---|---|---|---|---|
| R3 | 10 October 2001 | Reading | H | 1–0 | 23,431 | Dublin 45' |
| R4 | 28 November 2001 | Sheffield Wednesday | H | 0–1 | 26,526 | |

=== Intertoto Cup ===
| Round | Date | Opponent | Venue | Result | Attendance | Goalscorers |
|---|---|---|---|---|---|---|
| R3 First Leg | 14 July 2001 | NK Slaven Belupo (Croatia) | A | 1–2 | 3,000 | Ginola 88' |
| R3 Second Leg | 21 July 2001 | NK Slaven Belupo (Croatia) | H | 2–0 (won 3–2 on agg) | 27,580 | Hendrie 19', 41' |
| SF First Leg | 25 July 2001 | Rennes (France) | A | 1–2 | 15,753 | Vassell 90' |
| SF Second Leg | 1 August 2001 | Rennes (France) | H | 1–0 (won on away goals) | 30,782 | Dublin 5' |
| F First Leg | 7 August 2001 | Basel (Switzerland) | A | 1–1 | 25,879 | Merson 59' |
| F Second Leg | 21 August 2001 | Basel (Switzerland) | H | 4–1 (won 5–2 on agg) | 39,593 | Vassell 45', Ángel 55', 79', Ginola 83' |

=== UEFA Cup ===
| Round | Date | Opponent | Venue | Result | Attendance | Goalscorers |
|---|---|---|---|---|---|---|
| R1 First Leg | 20 September 2001 | NK Varteks (Croatia) | H | 2–3 | 27,132 | Ángel 54', 70' |
| R1 Second Leg | 27 September 2001 | NK Varteks (Croatia) | A | 1–0 (lost on away goals) | 12,100 | Hadji 90' |

== Players ==
=== First-team squad ===
Squad at end of season

Note: Flags indicate national team as defined under FIFA eligibility rules; some limited exceptions apply. Players may hold more than one non-FIFA nationality.

| No. | Pos. | Nation | Player |
|---|---|---|---|
| 1 | GK | DEN | Peter Schmeichel |
| 2 | DF | WAL | Mark Delaney |
| 3 | DF | ENG | Alan Wright |
| 4 | DF | SWE | Olof Mellberg |
| 5 | DF | TUR | Alpay Özalan |
| 6 | MF | NED | George Boateng (Note: Boateng was born in Nkawkaw, Ghana, but also qualified to represent the Netherlands internationally and represented them at U-21 level before making his international debut for the Netherlands in November 2001.) |
| 7 | MF | ENG | Ian Taylor |
| 8 | FW | COL | Juan Pablo Ángel |
| 9 | FW | ENG | Dion Dublin |
| 10 | MF | ENG | Paul Merson (captain) |
| 11 | DF | IRL | Steve Staunton |

| No. | Pos. | Nation | Player |
|---|---|---|---|
| 12 | GK | FIN | Peter Enckelman |
| 15 | DF | ENG | Gareth Barry |
| 16 | FW | ENG | Peter Crouch |
| 17 | MF | ENG | Lee Hendrie |
| 18 | MF | ENG | Steve Stone |
| 19 | FW | CRO | Boško Balaban |
| 20 | MF | MAR | Mustapha Hadji |
| 21 | MF | GER | Thomas Hitzlsperger |
| 22 | FW | ENG | Darius Vassell |
| 30 | MF | MAR | Hassan Kachloul |
| 31 | DF | ENG | Jlloyd Samuel (Note: Samuel was born in San Fernando, Trinidad and Tobago, but also qualified to represent England internationally and would represent them at U-21 level and be called up to the senior team before switching his international allegiance to Trinidad and Tobago and making his international debut for Trinidad and Tobago in September 2009.) |

=== Left club during season ===
Note: Flags indicate national team as defined under FIFA eligibility rules; some limited exceptions apply. Players may hold more than one non-FIFA nationality.

| No. | Pos. | Nation | Player |
|---|---|---|---|
| 14 | MF | FRA | David Ginola (to Everton) |
| 26 | FW | ENG | Richard Walker (to Blackpool) |

| No. | Pos. | Nation | Player |
|---|---|---|---|
| 27 | MF | ENG | Michael Standing (to Bradford City) |
| 44 | FW | SCO | Neil Tarrant (Note: Tarrant was born in Darlington, England, but also qualified to represent Scotland internationally and represented them at U-21 level.) (to Ross County) |

=== Reserve squad ===
The following players made most of their appearances for the reserves this season, but may have also appeared for the reserves or the U-17s, or may have appeared for the first team in a friendly.

Note: Flags indicate national team as defined under FIFA eligibility rules; some limited exceptions apply. Players may hold more than one non-FIFA nationality.

| No. | Pos. | Nation | Player |
|---|---|---|---|
| 13 | GK | ENG | Boaz Myhill (Note: Myhill was born in Modesto, California, United States, but was raised in England from the age of 1, qualifying to represent any of the home nations. He represented England at U-17, U-18, and U-20 level before making his international debut for Wales in March 2008.) |
| 24 | MF | IRL | John McGrath |
| 25 | FW | ENG | Jon Bewers |
| 28 | MF | NIR | Gavin Melaugh |
| 29 | MF | ENG | Stephen Cooke |
| — | DF | ENG | Danny Haynes |
| — | DF | ENG | Danny Jackman |

| No. | Pos. | Nation | Player |
|---|---|---|---|
| — | DF | ENG | Andrew Marfell |
| — | MF | ENG | Jay Smith |
| — | MF | ENG | David Berks |
| — | MF | GER | Giovanni Speranza (Note: Speranza was born in Giessen, West Germany (now Germany), and later represented Italy internationally in futsal.) (on trial) |
| — | MF | UKR | Serhiy Kandaurov (Note: Kandaurov was born in Zheleznogorsk, Russian SFSR, Soviet Union (now Russia), but also qualified to represent Ukraine internationally and made his international debut for Ukraine in August 1992.) (on trial from Benfica) |
| — | | | Stefan Andersson |

=== U-19 squad ===
The following players made most of their appearances for the U-19s this season, but may have also appeared for the reserves or the U-17s.

Note: Flags indicate national team as defined under FIFA eligibility rules; some limited exceptions apply. Players may hold more than one non-FIFA nationality.

| No. | Pos. | Nation | Player |
|---|---|---|---|
| 23 | FW | ENG | Stefan Moore |
| 39 | GK | IRL | Wayne Henderson |
| 42 | FW | IRL | Peter Hynes |
| 43 | DF | ENG | Liam Ridgewell |
| 46 | DF | ENG | Ben Willetts |
| — | DF | ENG | David Andrewartha |
| — | DF | ENG | Rob Edwards (Note: Edwards was born in Madeley, England, and represented them at U-16 level, but also qualified to represent Wales internationally through his parents and would make his international debut for Wales in March 2003.) |
| — | DF | ENG | Leon Hylton |
| — | DF | ENG | Cameron Stuart |
| — | DF | IRL | Seán Dillon |
| — | MF | ENG | Ryan Amoo |

| No. | Pos. | Nation | Player |
|---|---|---|---|
| — | MF | ENG | Jamie Cunnington (on trial to Bradford City) |
| — | MF | ENG | Alexis Nicolas (Note: Nicolas was born in Westminster, England, but also qualified to represent Cyprus internationally and represented them at U-21 level.) |
| — | MF | ENG | James Pawley |
| — | MF | ENG | Peter Whittingham |
| — | MF | NIR | David Scullion |
| — | MF | DEN | Thomas Kristensen (on trial from AB) |
| — | MF | RUS | Alexei Eremenko (Note: Eremenko was born in Rostov-on-Don, Russian SFSR, Soviet Union (now Russia), but was raised in Finland from the age of 7, gained Finnish citizenship in 2003, and would make his international debut for Finland in October 2003.) (on trial from FC Jokerit) |
| — | FW | ENG | Lee McGuire |
| — | FW | ENG | Michael Husbands |
| — | FW | FRO | Hjalgrím Elttør (on trial from KÍ) |
| — | DF | | Andy Wells |

=== U-17 squad ===
The following players made most of their appearances for the U-17s this season, but may have also appeared for the reserves or the U-19s.

Note: Flags indicate national team as defined under FIFA eligibility rules; some limited exceptions apply. Players may hold more than one non-FIFA nationality.

| No. | Pos. | Nation | Player |
|---|---|---|---|
| — | GK | ENG | Antoni Pecora |
| — | GK | IRL | Stephen Gahan |
| — | DF | ENG | Stuart Bridges |
| — | DF | ENG | Gary Cahill |
| — | DF | ENG | Scott Cormell |
| — | DF | ENG | Nick Green |
| — | DF | ENG | Paul Green |
| — | DF | ENG | James O'Connor |
| — | DF | ENG | Oliver Williams |
| — | MF | ENG | Adam Baptist |
| — | MF | ENG | Jamie Ward (Note: Ward was born in Birmingham, England, but also qualifies to represent Northern Ireland internationally through his grandfather and represented them at U-19 and U-21 level before making his international debut for Northern Ireland in August 2011.) |
| — | MF | SCO | Colin Marshall |

| No. | Pos. | Nation | Player |
|---|---|---|---|
| — | MF | NIR | Steven Davis |
| — | MF | IRL | Stephen Foley-Sheridan |
| — | FW | ENG | Gabriel Agbonlahor |
| — | FW | ENG | Mark Atkinson |
| — | FW | ENG | Luke Moore |
| — | FW | ENG | Shane Paul |
| — | FW | SCO | Alan Brazil |
| — | MF | | Rowan Caney |
| — | MF | | John Grady |
| — | MF | | David Nolan |
| — | | | Daniel Bridges |

=== Other players ===
The following players did not play for any Aston Villa team this season.

Note: Flags indicate national team as defined under FIFA eligibility rules; some limited exceptions apply. Players may hold more than one non-FIFA nationality.

| No. | Pos. | Nation | Player |
|---|---|---|---|
| — | DF | ENG | Liam Folds |
| — | DF | ENG | Jamie McCombe (on trial from Scunthorpe United) |
| — | DF | IRL | Pierre Ennis |
| — | DF | DEN | Casper Abildgaard (on trial from AB) |

| No. | Pos. | Nation | Player |
|---|---|---|---|
| — | MF | IRL | Keith Fahey |
| — | FW | ENG | John Turner |
| — | MF | | John Malpass |

== Statistics ==
=== Appearances and goals ===
| No. | Pos | Nat | Player | Total | | Premier League | | FA Cup | | League Cup | | Continental | |
| No. | Pos | Nat | Player | Apps | Goals | Apps | Goals | Apps | Goals | Apps | Goals | Apps | Goals |
Goalkeepers
| 1 | GK | (Denmark) DEN | Peter Schmeichel | 36 | 1 | 29 | 1 | 1 | 0 | 2 | 0 | 4 | 0 |
| 12 | GK | (Finland) FIN | Peter Enckelman | 14 | 0 | 9 | 0 | 0 | 0 | 0 | 0 | 4+1 | 0 |
Defenders
| 2 | DF | (Wales) WAL | Mark Delaney | 39 | 0 | 30 | 0 | 0 | 0 | 1 | 0 | 8 | 0 |
| 3 | DF | (England) ENG | Alan Wright | 32 | 0 | 23 | 0 | 1 | 0 | 1 | 0 | 7 | 0 |
| 4 | DF | (Sweden) SWE | Olof Mellberg | 36 | 0 | 32 | 0 | 1 | 0 | 1 | 0 | 2 | 0 |
| 5 | DF | (Turkey) TUR | Alpay Özalan | 24 | 0 | 14 | 0 | 0 | 0 | 2 | 0 | 8 | 0 |
| 11 | DF | (Republic of Ireland) IRL | Steve Staunton | 38 | 0 | 30+3 | 0 | 1 | 0 | 2 | 0 | 2 | 0 |
| 31 | DF | (England) ENG | Jlloyd Samuel | 26 | 0 | 17+6 | 0 | 1 | 0 | 0 | 0 | 0+2 | 0 |
Midfielders
| 6 | MF | (Netherlands) NED | George Boateng | 48 | 1 | 37 | 1 | 1 | 0 | 1+1 | 0 | 8 | 0 |
| 7 | MF | (England) ENG | Ian Taylor | 18 | 4 | 7+9 | 3 | 1 | 1 | 1 | 0 | 0 | 0 |
| 10 | MF | (England) ENG | Paul Merson | 27 | 3 | 18+3 | 2 | 1 | 0 | 0 | 0 | 5 | 1 |
| 14 | MF | (France) FRA | David Ginola | 13 | 2 | 0+5 | 0 | 0 | 0 | 1+1 | 0 | 3+3 | 2 |
| 15 | MF | (England) ENG | Gareth Barry | 28 | 0 | 16+4 | 0 | 0+1 | 0 | 0 | 0 | 6+1 | 0 |
| 17 | MF | (England) ENG | Lee Hendrie | 39 | 4 | 25+4 | 2 | 1 | 0 | 2 | 0 | 7 | 2 |
| 18 | MF | (England) ENG | Steve Stone | 32 | 1 | 14+8 | 1 | 0+1 | 0 | 1 | 0 | 5+3 | 0 |
| 20 | MF | (Morocco) MAR | Mustapha Hadji | 32 | 3 | 17+6 | 2 | 0+1 | 0 | 2 | 0 | 3+3 | 1 |
| 21 | MF | (Germany) GER | Thomas Hitzlsperger | 12 | 1 | 11+1 | 1 | 0 | 0 | 0 | 0 | 0 | 0 |
| 30 | MF | (Morocco) MAR | Hassan Kachloul | 31 | 2 | 17+5 | 2 | 0 | 0 | 2 | 0 | 6+1 | 0 |
Forwards
| 8 | FW | (Colombia) COL | Juan Pablo Ángel | 35 | 16 | 26+3 | 12 | 1 | 0 | 1 | 0 | 2+2 | 4 |
| 9 | FW | (England) ENG | Dion Dublin | 30 | 6 | 9+12 | 4 | 0 | 0 | 1+1 | 1 | 5+2 | 1 |
| 16 | FW | (England) ENG | Peter Crouch | 7 | 2 | 7 | 2 | 0 | 0 | 0 | 0 | 0 | 0 |
| 19 | FW | (Croatia) CRO | Boško Balaban | 11 | 0 | 0+8 | 0 | 0 | 0 | 1+1 | 0 | 1 | 0 |
| 22 | FW | (England) ENG | Darius Vassell | 44 | 14 | 30+6 | 12 | 1 | 0 | 0+1 | 0 | 2+4 | 2 |
Players transferred out during the season

Last updated: 30 May 2002
Source: Competitions

=== Starting 11 ===
Considering starts in all competitions

| No. | Pos. | Nat. | Name | MS | Notes |
|---|---|---|---|---|---|
| 1 | GK | (Denmark) | Peter Schmeichel | 36 | |
| 2 | RB | (Wales) | Mark Delaney | 39 | |
| 4 | CB | (Sweden) | Olof Mellberg | 36 | |
| 11 | CB | (Republic of Ireland) | Steve Staunton | 35 | |
| 3 | LB | (England) | Alan Wright | 32 | |
| 17 | RM | (England) | Lee Hendrie | 35 | |
| 10 | CM | (England) | Paul Merson | 24 | Alpay Özalan has 24 starts |
| 6 | CM | (Netherlands) | George Boateng | 47 | |
| 30 | LM | (Morocco) | Hassan Kachloul | 25 | |
| 8 | CF | (Colombia) | Juan Pablo Ángel | 30 | |
| 22 | CF | (England) | Darius Vassell | 33 | |
