= 1999–2000 Aston Villa F.C. season =

English football club season

Aston Villa
1999–2000 season
- Chairman: Doug Ellis
- Manager: John Gregory
- Stadium: Villa Park
- FA Premier League: 6th
- FA Cup: Runners-up
- League Cup: Semi-final
- Top goalscorer: League: Dion Dublin (12); All: Dion Dublin (16)
- Highest home attendance: 39,217 (vs. Liverpool, 2 October 1999; vs. Tottenham Hotspur, 29 December 1999; vs. Manchester United, 14 May 2000)
- Lowest home attendance: 23,885 (vs. Sheffield Wednesday, 18 December 1999)
- Average home league attendance: 31,697

The 1999–2000 English football season was Aston Villa's 8th season in the Premier League and their 12th consecutive season in the top division of English football.

Aston Villa matched their previous season's solid sixth-place finish. After starting the campaign brightly a run of nine matches without a win dragged Villa down to 15th. However, after that Villa rallied to go 12 matches unbeaten, and thereafter lost only two more games all season to finish sixth. Villa also reached the FA Cup final for the first time in 43 years, but their hopes of winning the famous trophy for the eighth time were ended by a 1–0 defeat at the hands of Chelsea, whose success was achieved in the last game at Wembley before the old stadium was rebuilt.

The season saw debuts for George Boateng (103), David James (67), Peter Enckelman (52), Benito Carbone (24), Najwan Ghrayib (5), and Neil Cutler (1).

Kit Supplier	Sponsor
<< Reebok >>	LDV Vans

== Premier League ==
Pos	Team	Pld	W	D	L	GF	GA	GD	Pts	Qualification or relegation
4	Liverpool	38	19	10	9	51	30	+21	67	Qualification for the UEFA Cup first round (Note: Chelsea qualified for the UEFA Cup as FA Cup winners.)
5	Chelsea	38	18	11	9	53	34	+19	65	Qualification for the UEFA Cup first round
6	Aston Villa	38	15	13	10	46	35	+11	58	Qualification for the Intertoto Cup third round
7	Sunderland	38	16	10	12	57	56	+1	58	
8	Leicester City	38	16	7	15	55	55	0	55	Qualification for the UEFA Cup first round (Note: Leicester City qualified for the UEFA Cup as League Cup winners.)

Source: Premier League
Rules for classification: 1) points; 2) goal difference; 3) number of goals scored.
Notes:

Results summary

Overall								Home						Away					
Pld	W	D	L	GF	GA	GD	Pts	W	D	L	GF	GA	GD	W	D	L	GF	GA	GD
38	15	13	10	46	35	+11	58	8	8	3	23	12	+11	7	5	7	23	23	0

Source: 1999-2000 FA Premier League table

Results by matchday

Match	1	2	3	4	5	6	7	8	9	10	11	12	13	14	15	16	17	18	19	20	21	22	23	24	25	26	27	28	29	30	31	32	33	34	35	36	37	38
Ground	A	H	H	A	A	H	A	H	A	H	A	H	A	H	A	A	H	H	A	H	A	A	H	H	A	A	H	H	A	A	H	A	H	A	H	H	A	H
Result	W	W	D	L	W	W	L	W	L	D	L	D	L	L	L	D	L	W	W	D	W	D	D	W	W	D	D	W	D	L	W	W	W	W	D	D	D	L
Position	5	1	2	5	2	2	6	3	6	6	9	8	11	11	13	13	15	12	12	12	10	10	9	8	7	8	8	7	6	6	6	6	6	6	6	6	6	6

Source: 11v11.com: 1999-2000 Aston Villa results
A = Away; H = Home; W = Win; D = Draw; L = Loss

=== Matches ===
Win Draw Loss

7 August 1999 1	Newcastle United	0–1	Aston Villa
		Report	Joachim 75'	Attendance: 36,376

11 August 1999 2	Aston Villa	3–0	Everton
	Joachim 9'; Dublin 57'; Taylor 85'	Report		Attendance: 30,337

16 August 1999 3	Aston Villa	2–2	West Ham United
	Dublin 5'; Dublin 52'	Report		Attendance: 26,250

21 August 1999 4	Chelsea	1–0	Aston Villa
		Report		Attendance: 35,071

24 August 1999 5	Watford	0–1	Aston Villa
		Report	Delaney 68'	Attendance: 19,161
Note: Gregory explained Mark Delaney's improved second-half display and goal: "We gave him a bollocking at half-time because he was playing like a tart and it seemed to do the trick."

28 August 1999 6	Aston Villa	1–0	Middlesbrough
	Dublin 5'	Report		Attendance: 28,728

11 September 1999 7	Arsenal	3–1	Aston Villa
		Report	Joachim 44'	Attendance: 38,093

18 September 1999 8	Aston Villa	1–0	Bradford City
	Dublin 71'	Report		Attendance: 28,083

25 September 1999 9	Leicester City	3–1	Aston Villa
		Report	Dublin 73'	Attendance: 19,917

2 October 1999 10	Aston Villa	0–0	Liverpool
		Report		Attendance: 39,217

18 October 1999 11	Sunderland	2–1	Aston Villa
		Report	Dublin 47'	Attendance: 41,045

23 October 1999 12	Aston Villa	1–1	Wimbledon
	Dublin 35'	Report		Attendance: 27,160

30 October 1999 13	Manchester United	3–0	Aston Villa
		Report		Attendance: 55,211

6 November 1999 14	Aston Villa	0–1	Southampton
		Report		Attendance: 26,474

22 November 1999 15	Coventry City	2–1	Aston Villa
		Report	Dublin 41'	Attendance: 20,184

27 November 1999 16	Everton	0–0	Aston Villa
		Report		Attendance: 34,750

4 December 1999 17	Aston Villa	0–1	Newcastle United
		Report		Attendance: 34,531

18 December 1999 18	Aston Villa	2–1	Sheffield Wednesday
	Merson 69'; Taylor 82'	Report		Attendance: 23,885

26 December 1999 19	Derby County	0–2	Aston Villa
		Report	Boateng 68'; Taylor 78'	Attendance: 33,222

29 December 1999 20	Aston Villa	1–1	Tottenham Hotspur
	Taylor 75'	Report		Attendance: 39,217

3 January 2000 21	Leeds United	1–2	Aston Villa
		Report	Southgate 19'; Southgate 62'	Attendance: 40,027

15 January 2000 22	West Ham United	1–1	Aston Villa
		Report	Taylor 24'	Attendance: 24,237

22 January 2000 23	Aston Villa	0–0	Chelsea
		Report		Attendance: 33,704

5 February 2000 24	Aston Villa	4–0	Watford
	Stone 47'; Merson 57'; Merson 59'; Walker 81'	Report		Attendance: 27,647

14 February 2000 25	Middlesbrough	0–4	Aston Villa
		Report	Carbone 11'; Carbone 65'; Joachim 70'; Joachim 75'	Attendance: 31,571

26 February 2000 26	Bradford City	1–1	Aston Villa
		Report	Merson 38'	Attendance: 18,276

5 March 2000 27	Aston Villa	1–1	Arsenal
	Walker 62'	Report		Attendance: 36,930

11 March 2000 28	Aston Villa	1–0	Coventry City
	Ehiogu 45'	Report		Attendance: 33,177

15 March 2000 29	Liverpool	0–0	Aston Villa
		Report		Attendance: 43,615

18 March 2000 30	Southampton	2–0	Aston Villa
		Report		Attendance: 15,218

25 March 2000 31	Aston Villa	2–0	Derby County
	Carbone 40'; Boateng 57'	Report		Attendance: 28,613

5 April 2000 32	Sheffield Wednesday	0–1	Aston Villa
		Report	Thompson 90'	Attendance: 18,136

9 April 2000 33	Aston Villa	1–0	Leeds United
	Joachim 39'	Report		Attendance: 33,889

15 April 2000 34	Tottenham Hotspur	2–4	Aston Villa
		Report	Dublin 62' 69'; Carbone 70'; Wright 74'	Attendance: 35,304

22 April 2000 35	Aston Villa	2–2	Leicester City
	Thompson 31'; Merson 48'	Report		Attendance: 31,229

29 April 2000 36	Aston Villa	1–1	Sunderland
	Barry 60'	Report		Attendance: 33,949

6 May 2000 37	Wimbledon	2–2	Aston Villa
		Report	Hendrie 54'; Dublin 74'	Attendance: 19,188

14 May 2000 38	Aston Villa	0–1	Manchester United
		Report		Attendance: 39,217

== FA Cup ==
Round	Date	Opponent	Venue	Result	Attendance	Goalscorers
R3	11 December 1999	Darlington	H	2–1	22,101	Carbone 43', Dublin 63'
R4	8 January 2000	Southampton	H	1–0	25,025	Southgate 20'
R5	30 January 2000	Leeds United	H	3–2	30,026	Carbone 32', 58', 69'
QF	20 February 2000	Everton	A	2–1	35,331	Stone 16', Carbone 45'
SF	2 April 2000	Bolton Wanderers	N	0–0 (won 4–1 on pens)	62,828	
F	20 May 2000	Chelsea	N	0–1	78,217	

== League Cup ==
Round	Date	Opponent	Venue	Result	Attendance	Goalscorers
R2 1st Leg	14 September 1999	Chester City	A	1–0	4,364	Hendrie 77'
R2 2nd Leg	21 September 1999	Chester City	H	5–0 (6–0 on agg)	22,613	Boateng 17', Taylor 31', Hendrie 46', 47', Thompson 50'
R3	13 October 1999	Manchester United	H	3–0	33,815	Joachim 18', Taylor 49', Stone 90'
R4	1 December 1999	Southampton	H	4–0	17,608	Watson 22', Joachim 66', Dublin 72', 90'
QF	11 January 2000	West Ham United	A	3–1	25,592	Taylor 80', 118', Joachim 93'
SF 1st Leg	25 January 2000	Leicester City	H	0–0	28,037	
SF 2nd Leg	2 February 2000	Leicester City	A	0–1 (0–1 on agg)	21,843	

== Players ==
=== First-team squad ===
#	Name	Position	Nationality	Place of birth	Date of birth (age)	Signed from	Date signed	Fee	Apps	Gls
Goalkeepers
1	David James	GK	(England)	Welwyn Garden City	1 August 1970 (aged 28)	Liverpool	17 June 1999	£1,700,000	-	-
13	Michael Oakes	GK	(England)	Northwich	30 October 1973 (aged 25)	Academy	1 July 1991	—N/a	61	0
13*	Neil Cutler	GK	(England)	Perton	3 September 1976 (aged 22)	Chester City	30 November 1999	Free transfer	-	-
39	Peter Enckelman	GK	(Finland)	Turku	10 March 1977 (aged 22)	(Finland) TPS	1 February 1999	£200,000	0	0
40	Matthew Ghent	GK	(England)	Burton upon Trent	5 September 1980 (aged 18)	Academy	1 July 1997	—N/a	0	0
Defenders
2	Steve Watson	RB	(England)	North Shields	1 April 1974 (aged 25)	Newcastle United	15 October 1998	£4,000,000	30	0
3	Alan Wright	LB	(England)	Ashton-under-Lyne	28 September 1971 (aged 27)	Blackburn Rovers	10 March 1995	£1,000,000	199	3
4	Gareth Southgate (c)	CB	(England)	Watford	3 September 1970 (aged 28)	Crystal Palace	1 July 1995	£3,500,000	164	4
5	Ugo Ehiogu	CB	(England)	Hackney	3 November 1972 (aged 26)	West Bromwich Albion	12 July 1991	£40,000	255	14
15	Gareth Barry	LB	(England)	Hastings	23 February 1981 (aged 18)	Academy	1 January 1998	—N/a	39	2
20	Najwan Ghrayib	LB	(Israel)	Nazareth	30 January 1974 (aged 25)	(Israel) Hapoel Haifa	20 July 1999	£1,000,000	-	-
23	David Hughes	LB	(Wales)	Wrexham	1 February 1978 (aged 21)	Academy	1 July 1996	—N/a	7	0
24	Mark Delaney	RB	(Wales)	Haverfordwest	13 May 1976 (aged 23)	(Wales) Cardiff City	9 March 1999	£250,000	2	0
28	Tommy Jaszczun	CB	(England)	Kettering	16 September 1977 (aged 21)	Academy	1 July 1998	—N/a	1	0
30	Jon Bewers	RB	(England)	Kettering	10 September 1982 (aged 16)	Academy	1 July 1999	—N/a	-	-
31	Jlloyd Samuel	LB	(Trinidad and Tobago)	San Fernando	29 March 1981 (aged 18)	Academy	1 January 1999	—N/a	0	0
32	Aaron Lescott	CB	(England)	Birmingham	2 December 1978 (aged 20)	Academy	1 July 1998	—N/a	1	0
34	Colin Calderwood	CB	(Scotland)	Stranraer	20 January 1965 (aged 34)	Tottenham Hotspur	23 March 1999	£230,000	8	0
Midfielders
6	George Boateng	CM	(Netherlands)	(Ghana) Nkawkaw	5 September 1975 (aged 23)	Coventry City	20 July 1999	£4,500,000	-	-
7	Ian Taylor	CM	(England)	Birmingham	4 June 1968 (aged 31)	Sheffield Wednesday	21 December 1994	£1,000,000	178	22
8	Mark Draper	CM	(England)	Long Eaton	11 November 1970 (aged 28)	Leicester City	5 July 1995	£3,250,000	154	11
10	Paul Merson	AM	(England)	Harlesden	20 March 1968 (aged 31)	Middlesbrough	8 September 1998	£6,750,000	27	5
11	Alan Thompson	LM	(England)	Newcastle upon Tyne	22 December 1973 (aged 25)	Bolton Wanderers	5 June 1998	£4,500,000	28	2
17	Lee Hendrie	RM	(England)	Solihull	18 May 1977 (aged 22)	Academy	1 July 1995	—N/a	71	6
26	Steve Stone	RM	(England)	Gateshead	20 August 1971 (aged 27)	Nottingham Forest	11 March 1999	£5,500,000	10	0
27	Michael Standing	AM	(England)	Shoreham-by-Sea	20 March 1981 (aged 18)	Academy	1 July 1998	—N/a	0	0
38	John McGrath	CM	(Republic of Ireland)	Limerick	27 March 1980 (aged 19)	Academy	1 July 1999	—N/a	-	-
Forwards
9	Dion Dublin	CF	(England)	Leicester	22 April 1969 (aged 30)	Coventry City	5 November 1998	£5,750,000	24	11
12	Julian Joachim	CF	(England)	Peterborough	20 September 1974 (aged 24)	Leicester City	24 February 1996	£1,890,000	100	28
14	Neil Tarrant	CF	(Scotland)	(England) Darlington	24 June 1979 (aged 20)	(Scotland) Ross County	28 April 1998	£250,000	-	-
18	Benito Carbone	SS	(Italy)	Bagnara Calabra	14 August 1971 (aged 27)	Sheffield Wednesday	20 October 1999	£800,000	-	-
19	Richard Walker	CF	(England)	Bloxwich	8 November 1977 (aged 21)	Academy	1 July 1997	—N/a	1	0
21	Darren Byfield	CF	(Jamaica)	(England) Sutton Coldfield	29 September 1976 (aged 22)	Academy	1 July 1997	—N/a	10	0
22	Darius Vassell	CF	(England)	Birmingham	13 June 1980 (aged 19)	Academy	1 January 1998	—N/a	11	2
25	Gustavo Bartelt	CF	(Argentina)	Buenos Aires	2 September 1974 (aged 24)	(Italy) Roma	6 January 2000	Loan	-	-
29	Stan Collymore	CF	(England)	Tittensor	22 January 1971 (aged 28)	Liverpool	13 May 1997	£7,000,000	61	15

*squad number was re-used following a players departure.
Note: Stats and ages are correct as of July 1, 1999.

Squad at end of season

Note: Flags indicate national team as defined under FIFA eligibility rules; some limited exceptions apply. Players may hold more than one non-FIFA nationality.

No.	Pos.	Nation	Player
1	GK	ENG	David James
2	DF	ENG	Steve Watson
3	DF	ENG	Alan Wright
4	DF	ENG	Gareth Southgate (captain)
5	DF	ENG	Ugo Ehiogu
6	MF	NED	George Boateng (Note: Boateng was born in Nkawkaw, Ghana, but also qualified to represent the Netherlands internationally and represented them at U-21 level before making his international debut for the Netherlands in November 2001.)
7	MF	ENG	Ian Taylor
8	MF	ENG	Mark Draper
9	FW	ENG	Dion Dublin
10	FW	ENG	Paul Merson
11	MF	ENG	Alan Thompson
12	FW	ENG	Julian Joachim

No.	Pos.	Nation	Player
13	GK	ENG	Neil Cutler
15	DF	ENG	Gareth Barry
17	MF	ENG	Lee Hendrie
18	FW	ITA	Benito Carbone
19	FW	ENG	Richard Walker
20	DF	ISR	Najwan Ghrayib
22	FW	ENG	Darius Vassell
24	DF	WAL	Mark Delaney
26	MF	ENG	Steve Stone
30	DF	ENG	Jon Bewers
31	DF	ENG	Jlloyd Samuel (Note: Samuel was born in San Fernando, Trinidad and Tobago, but also qualified to represent England internationally and would represent them at U-18, U-20, and U-21 level and be called up to the senior team before switching his international allegiance to Trinidad and Tobago and making his international debut for Trinidad and Tobago in September 2009.)
39	GK	FIN	Peter Enckelman

=== Left club during season ===
Note: Flags indicate national team as defined under FIFA eligibility rules; some limited exceptions apply. Players may hold more than one non-FIFA nationality.

No.	Pos.	Nation	Player
13	GK	ENG	Michael Oakes (to Wolves)
23	DF	WAL	David Hughes (to Shrewsbury Town)
28	DF	ENG	Tommy Jaszczun (to Blackpool)

No.	Pos.	Nation	Player
29	FW	ENG	Stan Collymore (to Leicester City)
34	DF	SCO	Colin Calderwood (to Nottingham Forest)

=== Reserve squad ===
The following players spend most of the season playing for the reserves, and did not appear for the first team.

Note: Flags indicate national team as defined under FIFA eligibility rules; some limited exceptions apply. Players may hold more than one non-FIFA nationality.

No.	Pos.	Nation	Player
14	FW	SCO	Neil Tarrant (Note: Tarrant was born in Darlington, England, but also qualified to represent Scotland internationally and represented them at U-21 level.)
16	FW	WAL	Graham Evans
21	FW	ENG	Darren Byfield (Note: Byfield was born in Sutton Coldfield, England, but also qualified to represent Jamaica internationally and would make his international debut for Jamaica in 2003.)
25	FW	ARG	Gustavo Bartelt (on loan from Roma)
27	MF	ENG	Michael Standing
32	MF	ENG	Aaron Lescott
38	MF	IRL	John McGrath

No.	Pos.	Nation	Player
40	GK	ENG	Matthew Ghent
—	DF	WAL	Darren Moss (on trial from Chester City)
—	DF	DEN	Morten Karlsen (on trial from B.93)
—	MF	ENG	Michael Blackwood
—	FW	BRA	Marcus di Giuseppe (on trial)

=== Under-19 squad ===
The following players spent most of the season playing for the under-19 squad, but may have played for the U-17s and reserves.

Note: Flags indicate national team as defined under FIFA eligibility rules; some limited exceptions apply. Players may hold more than one non-FIFA nationality.

No.	Pos.	Nation	Player
—	DF	ENG	Liam Folds
—	DF	ENG	Danny Haynes
—	DF	ENG	Karl Johnson
—	DF	ENG	Jamie Kearns
—	DF	ENG	Martyn Lancaster (on trial from Chester City)
—	DF	SCO	Gary McSeveney
—	DF	WAL	Stuart Thornley
—	DF	COD	Carlin Itonga (on trial from Arsenal)
—	MF	ENG	David Berks
—	MF	ENG	David Harding

No.	Pos.	Nation	Player
—	MF	ENG	Robert Hughes (on trial from Fulham)
—	MF	ENG	Luke Prince
—	MF	ENG	Jay Smith
—	MF	ENG	Gregory Walters
—	MF	NIR	Gavin Melaugh
—	MF	SWE	David Curtolo
—	FW	ENG	Stephen Evans
—	FW	ENG	Andrew Marfell
—	FW	SWE	Isaac N'Kubi (Note: N'Kubi was born in Uganda, but also qualified to represent Sweden internationally and represented them at U-17 level.)
—			Adam A. Smith

=== Under-17 squad ===
The following players spent most of the season playing for the under-17 squad, but may have played for the U-19s and reserves.

Note: Flags indicate national team as defined under FIFA eligibility rules; some limited exceptions apply. Players may hold more than one non-FIFA nationality.

No.	Pos.	Nation	Player
—	GK	ENG	Boaz Myhill (Note: Myhill was born in Modesto, California, United States, but was raised in England from the age of 1, qualifying to represent any of the home nations. He represented England at U-17, and U-18, and U-20 level before making his international debut for Wales in March 2008.)
—	GK	IRL	Wayne Henderson
—	DF	ENG	David Andrewartha
—	DF	ENG	Rob Edwards (Note: Edwards was born in Madeley, England, but also qualified to represent Wales internationally through his parents and would make his international debut for Wales in March 2003.)
—	DF	ENG	Leon Hylton
—	DF	ENG	Danny Jackman
—	DF	ENG	Liam Ridgewell
—	DF	ENG	Andy Wells
—	DF	ENG	Ben Willets
—	DF	IRL	Seán Dillon
—	MF	ENG	Ryan Amoo
—	MF	ENG	Stephen Cooke

No.	Pos.	Nation	Player
—	MF	ENG	Jamie Cunnington
—	MF	ENG	Lee McGuire
—	MF	ENG	Alexis Nicolas (Note: Nicolas was born in Westminster, England, but also qualified to represent Cyprus internationally and represented them at U-21 level.)
—	MF	ENG	Jamie Pawley
—	MF	IRL	Keith Fahey
—	FW	ENG	Mark DeBolla
—	FW	ENG	Michael Husbands
—	FW	ENG	Stuart Lewis
—	FW	ENG	Stefan Moore
—			Keiron Richardson
—			Adam Rundell

=== Other players ===
The following players did not appear for any squad this season.

Note: Flags indicate national team as defined under FIFA eligibility rules; some limited exceptions apply. Players may hold more than one non-FIFA nationality.

No.	Pos.	Nation	Player
—	DF	ENG	Wesley Meacham
—	MF	ENG	Darren Middleton
—	MF	ITA	Marco Russo (on trial)

No.	Pos.	Nation	Player
—	FW	SCO	Brian Mulholland
—	FW	GRE	Yannis Anastasiou (on trial from Anderlecht)

== Statistics ==
=== Starting 11 ===
No.	Pos.	Nat.	Name	MS	Notes
1	GK	(England)	David James	38	
24	RB	(Wales)	Mark Delaney	30	
5	CB	(England)	Ugo Ehiogu	43	
4	CB	(England)	Gareth Southgate	42	
3	LB	(England)	Alan Wright	41	
10	RM	(England)	Paul Merson	34	
7	CM	(England)	Ian Taylor	35	
6	CM	(Netherlands)	George Boateng	41	
11	LM	(England)	Alan Thompson	43	
12	CF	(England)	Julian Joachim	37	
9	CF	(England)	Dion Dublin	28	Benito Carbone has 28 starts

== Transfers ==
=== Transferred in ===
Date	Pos	Player	From	Fee
17 June 1999	GK	David James	Liverpool	£1,700,000
20 July 1999	LB	(Israel) Najwan Ghrayib	(Israel) Hapoel Haifa	£1,000,000
20 July 1999	DM	(Netherlands) George Boateng	Coventry City	£4,500,000
20 October 1999	SS	(Italy) Benito Carbone	Sheffield Wednesday	£800,000
30 November 1999	GK	Neil Cutler	Chester City	Free transfer
				£8,000,000

=== Loaned in ===
Date	Pos	Player	From	Loan End
6 January 2000	CF	(Argentina) Gustavo Bartelt	(Italy) Roma	31 May 2000

=== Transferred out ===
Date	Pos	Player	To	Fee
1 July 1999	GK	Mark Bosnich	Manchester United	Free transfer
7 July 1999	CF	(Republic of Ireland) Alan Lee	Burnley	£200,000
13 July 1999	CM	(Italy) Fabio Ferraresi	(Italy) Verona	Free transfer
22 July 1999	CB	Riccardo Scimeca	Nottingham Forest	£3,000,000
29 July 1999	RB	Simon Grayson	Blackburn Rovers	£750,000
24 September 1999	LB	(Wales) David Hughes	Shrewsbury Town	Free transfer
27 September 1999	GK	Adam Rachel	Blackpool	Free transfer
29 October 1999	GK	Michael Oakes	Wolverhampton Wanderers	£500,000
20 January 2000	LB	Tommy Jaszczun	Blackpool	£50,000
10 February 2000	CF	Stan Collymore	Leicester City	Free transfer
14 March 2000	CB	(Scotland) Colin Calderwood	Nottingham Forest	£70,000
				£4,570,000

=== Loaned out ===
Date	Pos	Player	To	Loan End
19 July 1999	CF	Stan Collymore	Fulham	15 October 1999
3 August 1999	CF	(Jamaica) Darren Byfield	Northampton Town	12 September 1999
17 September 1999	CF	(Jamaica) Darren Byfield	Cambridge United	25 October 1999
10 December 1999	CF	(Scotland) Neil Tarrant	(Scotland) Ayr United	31 May 2000
7 March 2000	CF	(Jamaica) Darren Byfield	Blackpool	31 May 2000
13 March 2000	LB	Aaron Lescott	Lincoln City	13 April 2000

=== Overall transfer activity ===
==== Expenditure ====
▼£8,000,000

==== Income ====
▲£4,570,000

==== Balance ====
▼£3,430,000
