= Egerton F.C. =

Association football club in England

Coordinates: 53°18′44.0″N 2°22′53.4″W

Egerton
- Full name: Egerton Football Club
- Founded: 2002; 24 years ago
- Ground: Egerton Youth Club, Knutsford
- Chairman: Tom O'Donnell
- League: Cheshire League League One
- 2024–25: Cheshire League League One, 5th of 16
Home colours

Egerton Football Club is a football club based in Knutsford, Cheshire, England. They are currently members of the Cheshire League League One and play at Egerton Youth Club.

== History ==
Egerton were formed in 2002 and was named after Maurice Egerton. In the 2017–18 season, Egerton received national media attention after the signings of former Football League players Jlloyd Samuel, Nathan Ellington and Dean Gorré. In the same season, Egerton finished fourth in the Cheshire League One, being promoted to the Premier Division in the process.

Egerton entered the FA Vase for the first time in 2019–20. The club were later withdrawn from the FA Vase after failing a ground grading inspection. They were relegated to the Cheshire League League One after finishing in 15th place during the 2023–24 season.

== Ground ==
The club play at Egerton Youth Club in Knutsford. In May 2016, chairman Tom O'Donnell announced plans to redevelop the site in order to be eligible for promotion to the North West Counties League.

== Records ==
- Best FA Vase performance: First qualifying round, 2019–20
