= Ian Taylor (footballer, born 1968) =

English footballer

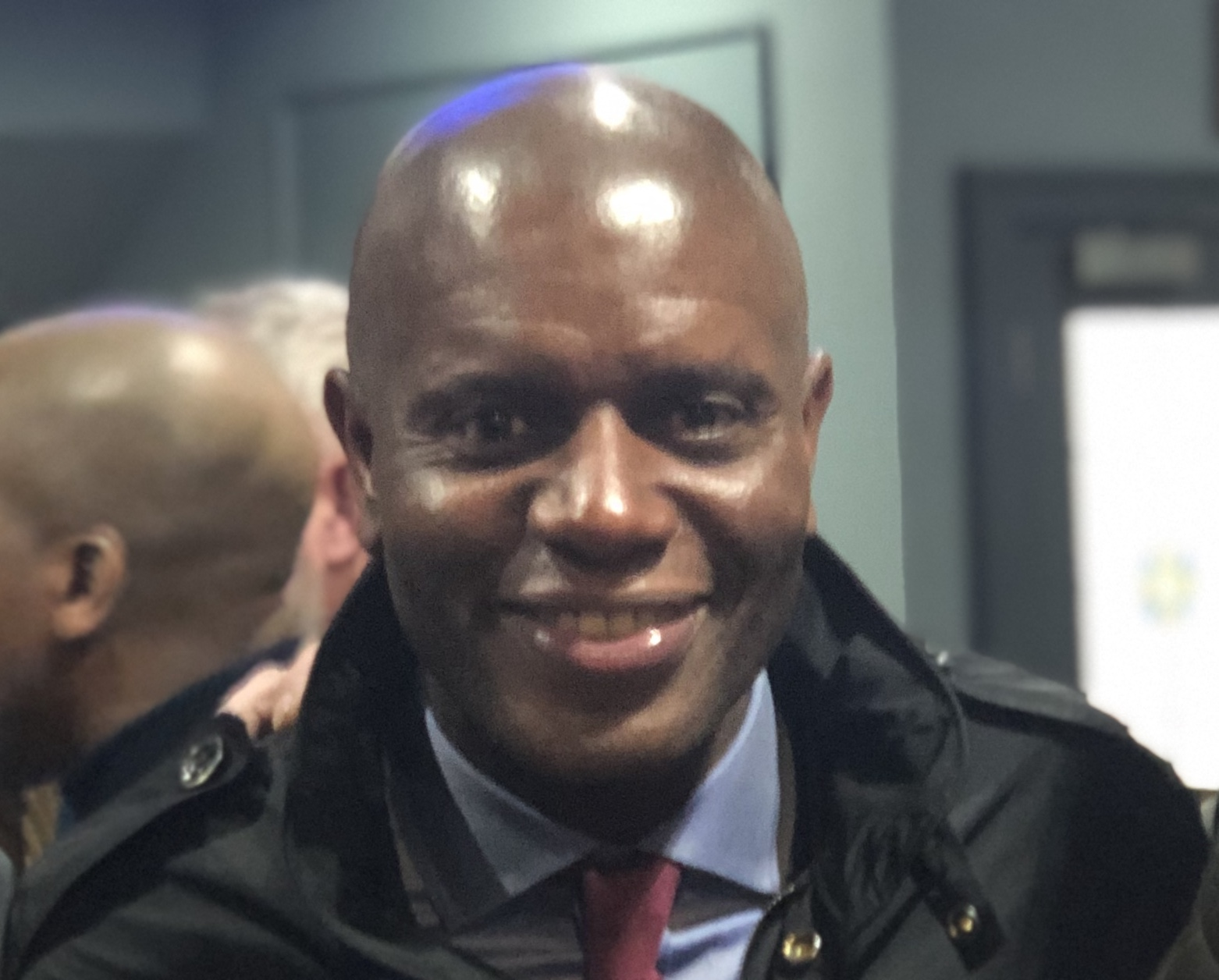
- Taylor in 2019

Personal information
- Full name: Ian Kenneth Taylor
- Date of birth: 4 June 1968 (age 58)
- Place of birth: Birmingham, England
- Height: 6 ft 2 in (1.88 m)
- Position: Midfielder

Youth career
- Municipal Officials
- Shirley Crusaders

Senior career*
Years	Team	Apps	(Gls)
1986–1992	Moor Green		
1992–1994	Port Vale	83	(28)
1994	Sheffield Wednesday	14	(1)
1994–2003	Aston Villa	233	(28)
2003–2005	Derby County	81	(14)
2005–2007	Northampton Town	66	(8)
Total		477	(79)
- * Club domestic league appearances and goals

Ian Kenneth Taylor (born 4 June 1968) is an English former professional footballer and sports television pundit.

A midfielder, he had a 15-year career in the Football League and Premier League, scoring 103 goals in 577 league and cup competitions. Before this, he had scored 67 goals in 235 matches playing Non-League football with Moor Green. He turned professional with Port Vale in 1992. With Vale, he lifted the Football League Trophy in 1993. His impressive performances earned him a place on the Second Division PFA Team of the Year in 1992–93 & 1993–94, as well as the club's Player of the Year award in 1993. He made a million-pound move to Sheffield Wednesday in June 1994, and he was sold on for another million to Aston Villa later in the year. He lifted the League Cup and reached the FA Cup final with the club he had supported as a boy. In 2003, he signed with Derby County, helping the club to the Championship play-offs before signing with Northampton Town in June 2005. He helped the club to win promotion out of League Two in 2005–06 before he announced his retirement in April 2007.

== Playing career ==
=== Moor Green ===
Taylor attended Washwood Heath Academy from 1978 to 1984. He played for Municipal Officials and Shirley Crusaders and was a forklift trucker driver when he started his career with Southern League Premier Division side Moor Green. He scored 23 goals in one season with the club and scored 17 goals in the 1991–92 campaign. He had an unsuccessful trial with Birmingham City. He got a move into the Football League in May 1992 after scoring in Green's Midland Floodlit Cup final victory, when Port Vale paid the club £15,000 (this figure later rose to £25,000 due to instalments based on appearances). He was spotted playing for Moor Green against Burton Albion by Ray Williams, who had intended to scout Burton player Darren Roberts. Williams said that, "within 30 seconds I could see he had ability, pace and bravery" and that he demonstrated his character by playing on despite injury. Taylor scored 67 goals in 235 matches for Moor Green.

=== Port Vale ===
Port Vale manager John Rudge saw him as a potential replacement for Robbie Earle. His debut came on 7 August 1992, in a 5–0 win over De Graafschap in the TNT Tournament. He became a regular in the side and in 1992–93 scored 19 goals to become the club's top scorer and earn himself the Player of the Year award, as well as a place on the PFA Second Division team. He was once again selected in the PFA's divisional team of the season for the 1993–94 season. He also lifted the Football League Trophy, scoring a "stunning overhead back heel" against Fulham in the opening round, and going on to play in the final as Vale beat Stockport County 2–1 at Wembley Stadium. He returned to Wembley for the Second Division play-off final, which ended in a 3–0 defeat to West Bromwich Albion. He would later state: "John Rudge... gave me the opportunity to play professional football. He put me in the team and had faith in me. That was the bedrock of my career".

=== Sheffield Wednesday ===
In June 1994, Taylor signed with Premier League club Sheffield Wednesday. The next month, a tribunal decided upon a £1 million fee, plus £100,000 for an England appearance and £25,000 for every ten goals up to a maximum of fifty goals as well as 15% of the profit of any future sale. As it happened he was shifted on to Brian Little's Aston Villa in December that year for £1 million plus Guy Whittingham.

=== Aston Villa ===
A lifelong supporter of the "Villans", as a child, he used to stand on the Holte End at Villa Park. This fact, combined with his utterly committed displays and knack of scoring crucial goals, quickly established him as a fans' favourite. Villa narrowly stayed in the Premier League in 1994–95 after finishing three points and one place above relegated Crystal Palace. Villa finished fourth in 1995–96, and Taylor scored in wins over Manchester United, Wimbledon, Leeds United, and Southampton. He also played and scored in the Aston Villa side that won the 1996 League Cup final 3–0 against Leeds.

He played 36 domestic games in 1996–97, scoring in wins over Leeds, Wimbledon, and Liverpool. He scored 9 goals in 44 games in 1997–98, and maintained his first-team place under new manager John Gregory. Taylor also netted important goals in Villa's 1997–1998 UEFA Cup run, when they would eventually be knocked out by Atlético Madrid on away goals at the quarter-final stage.

He scored four times in 38 games in 1998–99, and again Villa won all games in which he found the net, including a 2–1 victory at Coventry City in which Taylor scored both Villa's goals. He was prolific in 1999–2000, scoring ten goals in 42 games, helping Villa to reach the 2000 FA Cup final, where they lost out 1–0 to Chelsea. He had injured his hamstring in the semi-final against Bolton Wanderers, and recovered just in time for the final, being named in the first XI for the final ahead of Alan Thompson.

Taylor hit five goals in 35 games in 2000–01, including both goals in a 2–0 win over Tottenham Hotspur. However, he was restricted to just 18 appearances in 2001–02, as manager John Gregory was replaced by Graham Taylor in January. After only 19 appearances in 2002–03, Taylor released him at the end of the campaign.

=== Derby County ===
Taylor joined First Division side Derby County, where he was made captain. He was the club's top-scorer in 2003–04 with twelve goals, as Derby avoided relegation by a single point. He played 44 games in 2004–05, as Derby reached the Championship play-offs, where they were defeated by Preston North End in the semi-finals. Taylor was released in May 2005.

=== Northampton Town ===
In June 2005 he signed with League Two club Northampton Town. The "Cobblers" won promotion in 2005–06 as League Two runners-up, with Taylor making 38 appearances. He was named to the PFA Team of the Year for his performances. Northampton retained their League One status in 2006–07, as Taylor played another 36 games. Taylor announced that the game at home to Huddersfield Town on 27 April would be the last of his career before retiring as a professional player. A small number of Aston Villa fans attended this match. At Villa's away match against Manchester City, the day after Taylor's final game, the travelling Villa fans sang "There's only one Ian Taylor".

== International career ==
Taylor was born in Birmingham, England and is of Barbadian descent through his mother. In May 2004, he was considered by Barbados manager Kenville Layne for a call-up to the 2006 FIFA World Cup qualifying double-header against Saint Kitts and Nevis in June 2004. Taylor revealed that he had turned down a similar approach from the nation five years previously, as he wanted to play for England.

== Post-retirement ==
Taylor is now an occasional football co-commentator for the Aston Villa website's Villa TV and can regularly be seen at Aston Villa games as he was appointed as a Club Ambassador in February 2011. He also makes occasional appearances on Sky TV and TNT Sports. During the 2007–08 season, he has been given a regular column as the final feature in Aston Villa's matchday programme, titled 'Tayls Talking'. Still held in very high esteem by Villa fans, he maintained his cult status in October 2005, when instead of sitting with the directors and VIPs for the Second City derby against Birmingham City at St Andrew's, he was amongst the travelling Aston Villa contingent; Taylor did the same thing again in Villa's game against Blues on 11 November 2007.

In 2012, Taylor created his own brand of headphones and speakers called iT7 Audio, worn by a host of celebrities and sportspeople supporting the brand. Taylor is also a director of Optima Sport, which brings academy football teams from across the world to compete against academies in the UK. He also runs his own consultancy in the solar and renewable energy industry, being UK Ambassador for SNRG in the renewable energy and sustainability sector and is an Ambassador for car company Express Vehicle Contracts.

In January 2024, Taylor was named by Aston Villa as a member of the Honorary Anniversary Board ahead of the club's 150th anniversary season.

== Career statistics ==
Appearances and goals by club, season and competition
Club	Season	League			FA Cup		League Cup		Other		Total	
Club	Season	Division	Apps	Goals	Apps	Goals	Apps	Goals	Apps	Goals	Apps	Goals
Port Vale	1992–93	Second Division	41	15	4	1	2	1	9 (Note: 6 appearances and 2 goals in the Football League Trophy, 3 appearances in the play-offs.)	2	56	19
Port Vale	1993–94	Second Division	42	13	2	0	2	1	4 (Note: Appearance(s) in the Football League Trophy.)	2	50	16
Port Vale	Total		83	28	6	1	4	2	13	4	106	35
Sheffield Wednesday	1994–95	Premier League	14	1	0	0	4	1	—		18	2
Aston Villa	1994–95	Premier League	22	1	2	0	0	0	—		24	1
Aston Villa	1995–96	Premier League	25	3	3	1	6	1	—		34	5
Aston Villa	1996–97	Premier League	34	2	0	0	3	1	—		37	3
Aston Villa	1997–98	Premier League	32	6	3	0	1	0	8 (Note: Appearance(s) in the UEFA Cup.)	3	44	9
Aston Villa	1998–99	Premier League	33	4	1	0	1	0	3	0	38	4
Aston Villa	1999–2000	Premier League	29	5	5	0	8	5	—		42	10
Aston Villa	2000–01	Premier League	29	4	1	0	1	0	4 (Note: Appearance(s) in the UEFA Intertoto Cup.)	1	35	5
Aston Villa	2001–02	Premier League	16	3	1	1	1	0	—		18	4
Aston Villa	2002–03	Premier League	13	0	1	0	2	1	3	1	19	2
Aston Villa	Total		233	28	17	2	23	8	18	5	291	43
Derby County	2003–04	First Division	42	11	1	0	1	1	—		44	12
Derby County	2004–05	Championship	39	3	2	0	1	0	2 (Note: Appearances in the play-offs.)	0	44	3
Derby County	Total		81	14	3	0	2	1	2	0	88	15
Northampton Town	2005–06	League Two	33	7	3	0	1	0	1	0	38	7
Northampton Town	2006–07	League One	33	1	3	0	0	0	—		36	1
Northampton Town	Total		66	8	6	0	1	0	1	0	74	8
Career total			477	79	32	3	34	12	34	9	577	103

== Honours ==
Moor Green

- Midland Floodlit Cup: 1992

Port Vale

- Football League Trophy: 1992–93
- Football league Second Division second-place promotion: 1993–94

Aston Villa

- Football League Cup: 1995–96
- FA Cup runner-up: 1999–2000

Northampton Town

- Football League Two second-place promotion: 2005–06

Individual

- PFA Team of the Year: 1992–93 Second Division, 1993–94 Second Division, 2005–06 League Two
- Port Vale Player of the Year: 1992–93
