= Steve Stone (footballer) =

English footballer (born 1971)

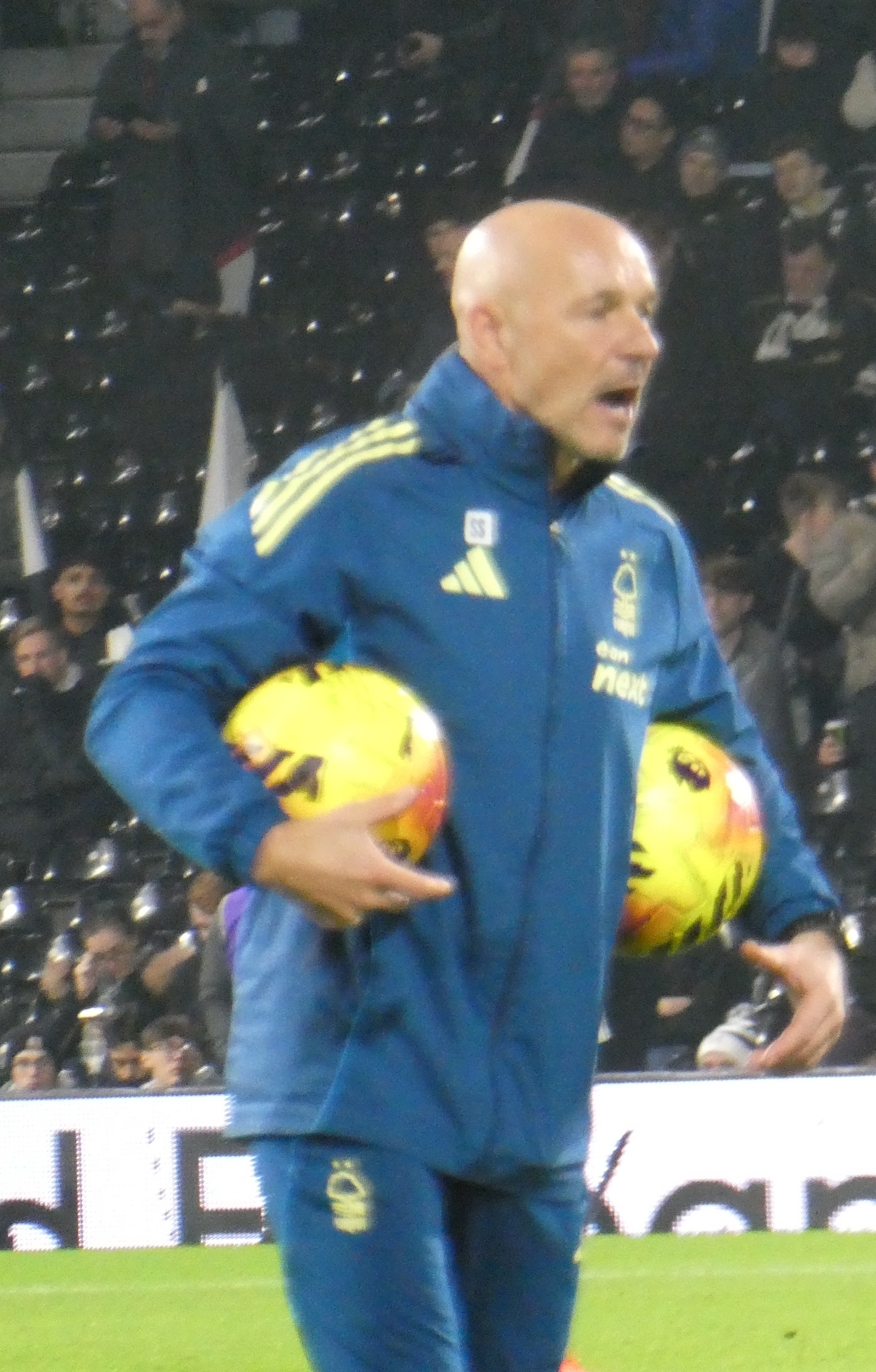
- Stone in 2025

Personal information
- Full name: Steven Brian Stone
- Date of birth: 20 August 1971 (age 55)
- Place of birth: Gateshead, England
- Height: 1.73 m (5 ft 8 in)
- Position: Right midfielder

Team information
- Current team: Nottingham Forest (first team coach)

Youth career
- –1989: Nottingham Forest

Senior career*
Years	Team	Apps	(Gls)
1989–1999	Nottingham Forest	193	(23)
1999–2002	Aston Villa	90	(4)
2002	→ Portsmouth (loan)	5	(1)
2002–2005	Portsmouth	68	(8)
2005–2006	Leeds United	12	(1)
Total		368	(37)

International career
1995–1996	England	9	(2)
- * Club domestic league appearances and goals

Steven Brian Stone (born 20 August 1971) is an English professional football coach and former player. He is currently first team coach at Premier League club Nottingham Forest.

As a player, he was a right midfielder who notably played in the Premier League for Nottingham Forest, Aston Villa and Portsmouth. Whilst with Forest he won the First Division title and played in the UEFA Cup. He also played in the 2000 FA Cup final for Villa. He finished his career with a brief spell in the Football League with Leeds United. He was capped nine times by England, scoring twice. He was part of England's Euro 96 team and made three appearances during the tournament.

Following retirement, Stone moved into coaching and worked for Newcastle United from July 2010 to June 2015 in a variety of different roles for both the first and reserve team. He was head coach of Burnley's under-23 team between 2018 and 2022.

== Club career ==
Stone was born in Gateshead. He began his career at Nottingham Forest.

The 27-year-old moved to Aston Villa for £5.5 million in March 1999. He was transferred to Portsmouth for the 2002–03 season. In June 2005, he signed a two-year deal with Leeds United.

Stone's career at Leeds was short-lived. He was injured in training as soon as he joined the club, and it took him most of his first season to recover from the tendinitis in his Achilles tendon due to contracting MRSA after the operation and then requiring a further two operations for the MRSA. Stone played a few matches at the end of the 2005–06 campaign, and continued to play at the start of the 2006–07 campaign, scoring once against West Brom. Injuries, however, struck again, and Stone retired early on 15 December 2006.

== International career ==
Stone was capped nine times at senior level for England. He made his debut in October 1995, coming on as a substitute in a 0–0 draw against Norway. Four days later, again coming off the bench, Stone scored his first international goal in a 3–1 win over Switzerland at Wembley Stadium. He also scored in his next game, which was his first start, as England drew 1–1 with Portugal.

Stone was capped three more times in the build-up to UEFA Euro 1996, where he was selected by manager Terry Venables as part of the 22-man England squad. He made three appearances during the competition, all off the bench. Stone's introduction during extra-time of the quarter-final versus Spain was his last appearance for England.

== Coaching career ==
On 27 July 2010, he was appointed reserve team assistant manager to Peter Beardsley at Newcastle United after a successful time working at their academy. Stone was promoted to first team coach on 14 December 2010, by new manager Alan Pardew.

Stone remained as first team coach after Pardew resigned to join Crystal Palace, with John Carver put in charge of Newcastle until the end of the season. On 9 June 2015, both he and Carver had their contracts terminated by Newcastle ahead of the announcement of Steve McClaren as new head coach.

On 12 November 2018, he replaced Michael Duff as the new U23 manager of Burnley.

Stone was dismissed on 15 April 2022, alongside first team manager Sean Dyche and fellow coach and former Forest teammate Ian Woan. Stone followed Dyche to Everton in January 2023 where he worked until his dismissal in January 2025. Stone followed Dyche once again to Nottingham Forest in October 2025.

== Personal life ==
Stone featured in the music video to the football song Three Lions, where he dances with the trophy mimicking Nobby Stiles at the 1966 FIFA World Cup final.

== Career statistics ==
=== Club ===
Appearances and goals by club, season and competition
Club	Season	League			FA Cup		League Cup		Europe		Other		Total	
Club	Season	Division	Apps	Goals	Apps	Goals	Apps	Goals	Apps	Goals	Apps	Goals	Apps	Goals
Nottingham Forest	1991–92	First Division	1	0	0	0	0	0	—		0	0	1	0
Nottingham Forest	1992–93	Premier League	12	1	0	0	1	0	—		—		13	1
Nottingham Forest	1993–94	First Division	45	5	2	0	5	0	—		2 (Note: Appearances in Anglo-Italian Cup)	0	54	5
Nottingham Forest	1994–95	Premier League	41	5	2	0	4	0	—		—		47	5
Nottingham Forest	1995–96	Premier League	34	7	6	0	2	0	8 (Note: Appearances in UEFA Cup)	2	—		50	9
Nottingham Forest	1996–97	Premier League	5	0	0	0	0	0	—		—		5	0
Nottingham Forest	1997–98	First Division	29	2	0	0	0	0	—		—		29	2
Nottingham Forest	1998–99	Premier League	26	3	1	0	3	2	—		—		30	5
Nottingham Forest	Total		193	23	11	0	15	2	8	2	2	0	229	27
Aston Villa	1998–99	Premier League	10	0	—		—		—		—		10	0
Aston Villa	1999–2000	Premier League	24	1	6	1	6	1	—		—		36	3
Aston Villa	2000–01	Premier League	34	2	3	1	1	0	4 (Note: Appearances in UEFA Intertoto Cup)	0	—		42	3
Aston Villa	2001–02	Premier League	22	1	1	0	1	0	8 (Note: Six appearances in UEFA Intertoto Cup, two in UEFA Cup)	0	—		32	1
Aston Villa	2002–03	Premier League	0	0	—		0	0	2	0	—		2	0
Aston Villa	Total		90	4	10	2	8	1	14	0	—		122	7
Portsmouth	2002–03	First Division	18	4	1	1	—		—		—		19	5
Portsmouth	2003–04	Premier League	32	2	1	0	3	0	—		—		36	2
Portsmouth	2004–05	Premier League	23	3	1	0	1	0	—		—		25	3
Portsmouth	Total		73	9	3	1	4	0	—		—		80	10
Leeds United	2005–06	Championship	2	0	0	0	0	0	—		2 (Note: Appearances in Championship play-offs)	0	4	0
Leeds United	2006–07	Championship	10	1	—		1	0	—		—		11	1
Leeds United	Total		12	1	0	0	1	0	—		2	0	15	1
Career total			368	37	24	3	28	3	22	2	4	0	446	45

=== International ===
Scores and results list England's goal tally first, score column indicates score after each Stone goal.

List of international goals scored by Steve Stone
No.	Date	Venue	Cap	Opponent	Score	Result	Competition	Ref.
1	15 November 1995	Wembley Stadium, London, England	2	Switzerland	3–1	3–1	Friendly	
2	12 December 1995	Wembley Stadium, London, England	3	Portugal	1–0	1–1	Friendly	

== Honours ==
Nottingham Forest

- Football League First Division: 1997–98

Aston Villa

- UEFA Intertoto Cup: 2001
- FA Cup runner-up: 1999–2000

Portsmouth

- Football League First Division: 2002–03

Individual

- PFA Team of the Year: 1995–96 Premier League
