= Jlloyd Samuel =

Trinidadian footballer (1981–2018)

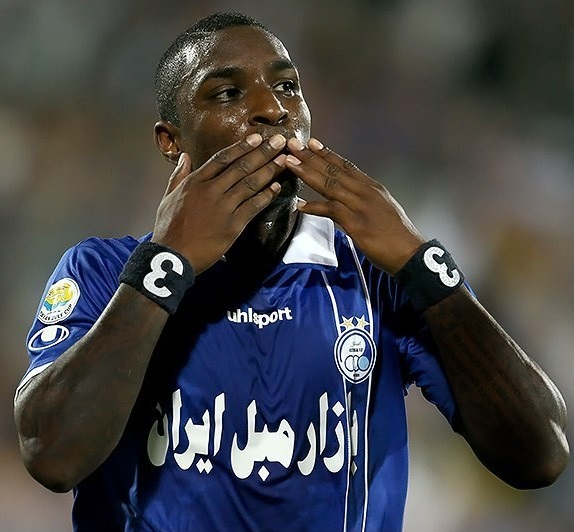
- Samuel playing for Esteghlal in 2013

Personal information
- Full name: Jlloyd Tafari Samuel
- Date of birth: 29 March 1981
- Place of birth: San Fernando, Trinidad and Tobago
- Date of death: 15 May 2018 (aged 37)
- Place of death: High Legh, Cheshire, England
- Height: 1.80 m (5 ft 11 in)
- Positions: Defender; midfielder

Youth career
- Senrab
- West Ham United
- Charlton Athletic
- 1997–1999: Aston Villa

Senior career*
Years	Team	Apps	(Gls)
1999–2007	Aston Villa	169	(2)
2001–2002	→ Gillingham (loan)	8	(0)
2007–2011	Bolton Wanderers	71	(0)
2011	→ Cardiff City (loan)	6	(0)
2011–2014	Esteghlal	60	(4)
2014–2015	Paykan	27	(0)
2017–2018	Egerton	8	(0)
Total		349	(6)

International career
1999–2000	England U18	4	(0)
2001	England U20	1	(0)
2001–2004	England U21	7	(0)
2009	Trinidad and Tobago	2	(0)

Managerial career
- 2017–2018: Egerton
- * Club domestic league appearances and goals

Jlloyd Tafari Samuel (/ˈdʒeɪlɔɪd/ JAY-loyd, 29 March 1981 – 15 May 2018) was a professional football coach and player who played as a defender and midfielder. Born in Trinidad and Tobago, he played for England up to under-21 level. He played two full international matches for Trinidad and Tobago in 2009.

Samuel played as a youth for the London-based junior team Senrab and was in the academies of West Ham United and Charlton Athletic before joining Aston Villa's youth team in 1997 as a trainee. He made a total of 199 appearances for Villa before moving to fellow Premier League club Bolton Wanderers in 2007, where he spent a further four years including a brief spell on loan at Cardiff City in the Championship. Samuel spent the last four years of his professional career in the Iran Pro League, representing Esteghlal and Paykan. He won a Hazfi Cup and a league title with Esteghlal.

After returning to England from Iran, he became player-manager of Cheshire-based team Egerton. He died on 15 May 2018 in a collision between two vehicles, at the age of 37.

== Club career ==
=== Aston Villa ===
Jlloyd Tafari Samuel was born in San Fernando, Trinidad and Tobago, on 29 March 1981, Samuel grew up in London and as a youth he played for Sunday league team Senrab, lining up in 1994 alongside future England internationals John Terry and Jermain Defoe. He was released from West Ham United on the same day as Paul Konchesky, Bobby Zamora (both of whom later returned to the Hammers) and Fitz Hall.

He signed for Aston Villa in July 1997 as a youth training scheme trainee, spending the 1997–98 and 1998–99 seasons in their youth team. Samuel's Aston Villa debut came in a second-round second-leg League Cup match against Chester City on 21 September 1999, which finished 5–0 in Aston Villa's favour. He replaced Gareth Barry after 51 minutes at Villa Park. On 25 March 2000, due to an injury to England international Gareth Southgate, he made his league debut in a 2–0 home win over Derby County, playing in central defence.

Samuel was loaned to First Division club Gillingham, where he made seven full appearances and one substitute appearance between 25 October and 3 December 2001. After he returned to Villa, the team's starting right-back, Mark Delaney, suffered an injury and Samuel filled his position; after the Welshman returned, Samuel was given a favoured left-back position. He reflected in a 2013 interview that his versatility helped him become a regular starter: "If you're just in one position and you're out of favour, you won't play. But if you can play in a variety of roles, it widens your options".

In the 2003–04 season, Samuel played every minute as Villa came 6th in the Premier League. He scored his first professional goal on 20 September 2003 against his former club Charlton, from 19 yards to give Villa a 2–1 victory. He scored again in the reverse fixture at The Valley on 27 March 2004, which the Villans won by the same score. That season he also scored on 27 January in a 2–0 League Cup semi-final second leg win over his future club Bolton Wanderers, who advanced 5–4 on aggregate.

Towards the end of his time at the Birmingham-based club, Samuel lost his place in the team as managers David O'Leary and Martin O'Neill opted for the Dutchman Wilfred Bouma to play in his position.

=== Bolton Wanderers ===
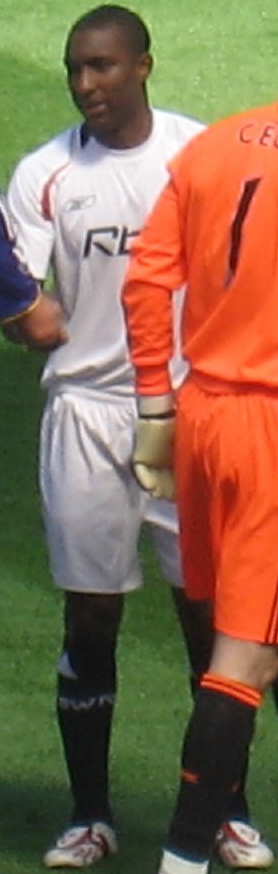
Samuel playing for Bolton Wanderers in 2008

Samuel signed a four-year contract with Bolton Wanderers on 1 July 2007, Sammy Lee's first signing as Bolton manager. He played in every Bolton match in the 2008–09 season, and 71 matches in total during his time at the club.

On 24 March 2011, Samuel joined Football League Championship side Cardiff City on loan until the end of the season wearing shirt number 21, as cover for the injured Mark Hudson. He had not played a game for Wanderers' during the 2010–11 season due to injury, and was released at the end of the season, bringing his four years at the club to an end.

=== Trials ===
Samuel joined Leeds United, managed by his former Aston Villa teammate Simon Grayson, on trial on 19 July 2011. He was included in the squad against Rochdale the same evening. He came off the bench at the start of the second half in a match Leeds won by a single first half goal from Max Gradel. Samuel was released from the trial after picking up an injury. On 30 July 2011, Samuel played for 79 minutes on trial for West Ham United in their final pre-season game against Real Zaragoza which West Ham won 2–0. However, West Ham decided against offering him a permanent contract.

=== Iran ===
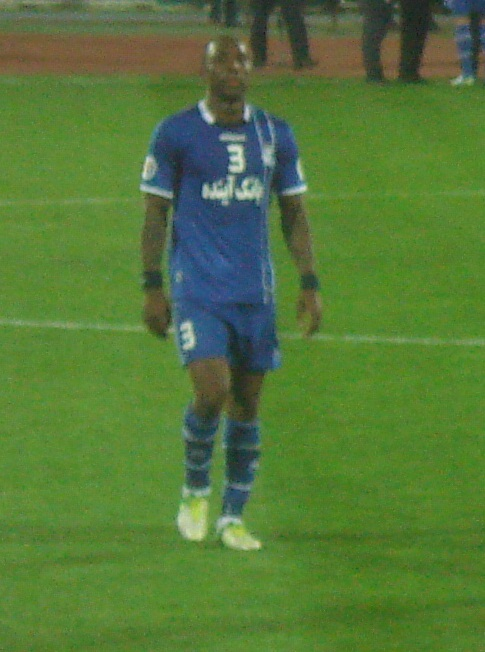
Samuel playing for Esteghlal in a 2013 AFC Champions League match against Al-Ain

On 31 December 2011, Samuel joined Iran Pro League side, Esteghlal, where he was welcomed with the local custom of sacrificing a sheep. He was re-united with his former Bolton teammate Andranik Teymourian. Samuel played in midfield in Iran, and told Aston Villa's official website that he was enjoying being able to move forward and score goals. His team won the Hazfi Cup in his first season and the Iran Pro League a year later. Esteghlal reached the semi-finals of the 2013 AFC Champions League, in which he scored a goal in the second leg of the semi-finals at home to FC Seoul in a 2–2 draw (4–2 aggregate loss).

Samuel extended his contract with Esteghlal on 12 July 2013, keeping him at the club until 2014. He left the club in June 2014, citing a five-month pay dispute with the club. He remained in Tehran and signed a two-year contract with newly promoted Paykan on 23 June 2014, effective 1 July.

=== Egerton ===
After returning to England, Samuel trained with Egerton, a Cheshire League One (12th tier) club who had fellow ex-Premier League players Emile Heskey, Danny Webber, Emmerson Boyce and Nathan Ellington training with them. Despite offers to play abroad, he chose Egerton so that he could remain close to his family, and the chairman appointed him player-manager for the 2017–18 season.

When speaking to the BBC following Samuel's death, Ellington mentioned that his teammate had been involved in a large-scale regeneration project in The Gambia in his final years.

== International career ==
Samuel was called up for England in March 2004 whilst enjoying a spell of good form for Aston Villa and could have made his debut in the 1–0 friendly loss to Sweden if Sven-Göran Eriksson had selected him. He had previously represented England at U-18, U-20 and U-21 level.

Later on, Samuel wanted to represent Trinidad and Tobago in the 2006 FIFA World Cup, but the application was rejected by FIFA. The rules in place at the time said that only players under the age of 21 could change their international allegiances.

On 7 August 2009, it was revealed that Bobby Zamora and Samuel had received Trinidad and Tobago passports, making them eligible to play for the Soca Warriors. He made his debut for Trinidad and Tobago on 5 September in a 4–1 loss away to Honduras in World Cup qualification and appeared for the second and last time four days later, receiving a yellow card in a 1–0 home loss to the United States.

== Death ==
Samuel was travelling home after taking his children to school on the morning of 15 May 2018 when his Range Rover collided with a van in High Legh, Cheshire. He died at the scene and the driver of the other vehicle was seriously injured. At the inquest in November 2019, it was revealed that Samuel was twice the drink-driving limit and that his car had strayed onto the wrong side of the road, causing a head-on crash.

Aston Villa wore black armbands for their Championship play-off match against Middlesbrough that night. His club at the time of his death, Egerton, cancelled all the remaining games that week as a mark of respect.

Samuel's body was burned so badly that he could only be identified by dental records and a blood sample that matched the DNA on his hairbrush. Before the inquest, his sister had accused his widow of faking his death, adding that the samples were not released for her to check against her own DNA. The coroner said that the samples remain the property of Samuel's widow.

== Personal life ==
Jlloyd Samuel was married to Emma and had three children with her, as well as a child from a previous relationship. His son Lakyle, born in 2006, is part of Manchester City's academy and captained England at the 2023 FIFA U-17 World Cup. Samuel's life and death were covered in the 2022 ITVBe documentary The Footballer, His Wife, and the Crash. The documentary claimed he had a secret second wife in Iran, fashion designer Helia Sahimi, and that he had converted to Islam to marry her.

== Career statistics ==
Appearances and goals by club, season and competition
Club	Season	League			Cup		League cup		Continental		Other		Total	
Club	Season	Division	Apps	Goals	Apps	Goals	Apps	Goals	Apps	Goals	Apps	Goals	Apps	Goals
Aston Villa	1998–99	Premier League	0	0	0	0	0	0	0	0	—		0	0
Aston Villa	1999–2000	Premier League	9	0	0	0	1	0	—		—		10	0
Aston Villa	2000–01	Premier League	3	0	1	0	0	0	3	0	—		7	0
Aston Villa	2001–02	Premier League	23	0	1	0	0	0	2	0	—		26	0
Aston Villa	2002–03	Premier League	38	0	1	0	4	0	2	0	—		45	0
Aston Villa	2003–04	Premier League	38	2	1	0	6	1	—		—		45	3
Aston Villa	2004–05	Premier League	35	0	1	0	2	0	—		—		38	0
Aston Villa	2005–06	Premier League	19	0	2	0	3	0	—		—		24	0
Aston Villa	2006–07	Premier League	4	0	1	0	0	0	—		—		5	0
Aston Villa	Total		169	2	8	0	16	1	7	0	—		200	3
Gillingham (loan)	2001–02	First Division	8	0	—		—		—		—		8	0
Bolton Wanderers	2007–08	Premier League	20	0	0	0	1	0	4	0	—		25	0
Bolton Wanderers	2008–09	Premier League	38	0	1	0	1	0	—		—		40	0
Bolton Wanderers	2009–10	Premier League	13	0	2	0	3	0	—		—		18	0
Bolton Wanderers	Total		71	0	3	0	5	0	4	0	—		83	0
Cardiff City (loan)	2010–11	Championship	6	0	0	0	0	0	—		1	0	7	0
Esteghlal	2011–12	Iran Pro League	13	1	1	0	—		9	0	—		23	1
Esteghlal	2012–13	Iran Pro League	25	2	3	1	—		11	4	—		39	7
Esteghlal	2013–14	Iran Pro League	22	1	3	1	—		5	0	—		30	2
Esteghlal	Total		60	4	7	2	—		25	4	—		92	10
Paykan	2014–15	Iran Pro League	27	0	1	0	—		—		—		28	0
Career total			341	6	19	2	21	1	35	4	1	0	417	13

== Honours ==
Aston Villa

- UEFA Intertoto Cup: 2001
- FA Cup runner-up: 1999–2000

Esteghlal

- Hazfi Cup: 2011–12
- Iran Pro League: 2012–13
