= John Turner (footballer, born 1986) =

English footballer

Personal information
- Date of birth: 12 February 1986 (age 40)
- Place of birth: Harrow, England
- Position: Forward

Youth career
- 2001–2002: Aston Villa
- 2002–2003: Cambridge United

Senior career*
Years	Team	Apps	(Gls)
2003–2006	Cambridge United	84	(10)
2005	→ Aldershot Town (loan)	4	(0)
2006	Rushden & Diamonds	11	(1)
2006–2007	Grays Athletic	10	(0)
2006	→ Braintree Town (loan)		
2007	→ Bishop's Stortford (loan)		
2007–2009	King's Lynn	34	(7)
2009–	Corby Town		
- * Club domestic league appearances and goals as of 20:52, 14 November 2009 (UTC)

John Turner (born 12 February 1986) is an English footballer who played in the Football League as a forward for Cambridge United and Rushden & Diamonds. He currently plays for Corby Town.

== Career ==
Born in Harrow, London, Turner joined Cambridge United's youth system as a 16-year-old, after leaving Aston Villa's youth academy. Still only 17, he made his debut on 12 April 2003 in the Third Division match against Exeter City: entering the game as a 76th-minute substitute, he scored the winning goal in the fourth minute of stoppage time. He scored a hat-trick in November 2004 in a League Two match against Rushden & Diamonds to give Cambridge a 3–1 victory. In late 2005 he spent a month on loan at Aldershot in an attempt to recover his goalscoring form, and joined Rushden & Diamonds on loan in January 2006. Despite being knocked unconscious during his first appearance, three days later he signed a permanent contract until the end of the 2005–06 season, at which point he was offered another deal but preferred to join Grays Athletic. Grays loaned him out to Conference South sides Braintree and Bishop's Stortford before releasing him at the end of the 2006–07 season when he joined King's Lynn. In January 2009, he left the club by mutual consent and signed for Corby Town, with whom he won promotion to the Conference North in 2009.
