= Leon Hylton =

English footballer

Personal information
- Date of birth: 27 January 1983 (age 43)
- Place of birth: England
- Position: Defender

Senior career*
Years	Team	Apps	(Gls)
–2004	Aston Villa	0	(0)
2003–2004	→ Swansea City (loan)	19	(0)

International career
2002−2003	England U20	3	(0)
- * Club domestic league appearances and goals

Leon Hylton (born 27 January 1983) is an English former footballer who played as a defender.

== Career ==
Hylton started his career with English Premier League side Aston Villa. Before the second half of 2002–03, Hylton was sent on loan to Swansea City in the English fourth tier, where he made 21 appearances and scored 0 goals and suffered injuries. On 11 February 2003, he debuted for Swansea City during a 0–3 loss to Bournemouth.

He played three times for England U20 and was part of the England squad at the 2003 Toulon Tournament.
