= Mark DeBolla =

English footballer

Personal information
- Date of birth: 1 January 1983 (age 43)
- Place of birth: Camberwell, London, England
- Position: Striker

Youth career
- 1999–2001: Aston Villa

Senior career*
Years	Team	Apps	(Gls)
2001–2004	Charlton Athletic	0	(0)
2003	→ Chesterfield (loan)	3	(0)
2004–2005	Chesterfield	37	(5)
2005–2006	Notts County	14	(1)
2006	Grays Athletic	8	(2)
2006–2007	Gravesend & Northfleet	47	(9)
2007–2008	AFC Wimbledon	25	(10)
2008	Croydon Athletic		
2008–2009	Sittingbourne	15	(4)
- * Club domestic league appearances and goals

Mark DeBolla (born 1 January 1983) is an English former footballer who played as a forward.

== Career ==
He has previously played for Charlton Athletic, Chesterfield, Notts County, Grays Athletic and Gravesend & Northfleet. At Notts County he scored his first and only goal for the club on his debut against Torquay United.

Towards the end of the 2007–08 season he was loaned out to Bromley. He returned to AFC Wimbledon after the end of Bromley's season to score the winner in the Isthmian Premier play-off final against Staines Town.

DeBolla began the 2008–09 season playing for Isthmian League Division One South club Croydon Athletic. He then joined Sittingbourne in February 2009.
