= Matthew Ghent =

English footballer

Personal information
- Full name: Matthew Ian Ghent
- Date of birth: 5 September 1980 (age 46)
- Place of birth: Burton upon Trent, England
- Position: Goalkeeper

Youth career
- 1996–1997: Aston Villa

Senior career*
Years	Team	Apps	(Gls)
1997–2000	Aston Villa	0	(0)
2000–2001	Lincoln City	1	(0)
2001	Forest Green Rovers	2	(0)
2001–2003	Barnsley	8	(0)
2006	Sutton Town		
2006	Tamworth	1	(0)
2007–2008	Solihull Moors		
2009	Rushall Olympic		

International career
1996–1997	England U-16		
1998–1999	England U-18		
- * Club domestic league appearances and goals as of 01:14, 12 April 2009 (UTC)

Matthew Ghent (born 5 September 1980) is an English retired professional football goalkeeper. He also played for England Under-16 and Under-18 teams.

== Career ==
Ghent started his football career with Aston Villa as an associated schoolboy player and as a schoolboy represented England 27 times at the age of 14-18 playing against the likes of Germany, Sweden and Brasil and was part of the prestigious National School of excellence playing with the likes of Michael Owen, Wes Brown and Scott Parker following this Ghent progressed to a traineeship at Aston Villa despite interest from Newcastle United before turning professional in 1997 at the age of 17. He appeared as an unused substitute for Aston Villa against Southampton in the Premier League 16 days after his 17th Birthday at the time making him the youngest ever Goalkeeper to appear on a Premier League teamsheet. From there he made further squad appearances against Arsenal and Manchester United that season. Having been a regular reserve at Aston Villa he left the club in December 2000 to trial at Nottingham Forest and later that season went on to join Lincoln City on a free transfer. Following this he joined Barnsley F.C. on a free transfer and went on to become a regular first team player making his debut in what would be the Championship today against Wimbledon FC where he saved a 75th-minute penalty to aid in Barnsley only away clean sheet of that season.

His league debut came on 2 December 2000 when he was a first-half substitute for the injured Alan Marriott in the 1–1 draw away to Carlisle United. He started the FA Cup surprise defeat at home to Dagenham & Redbridge the following week but after again not settling at Lincoln left the club a short time after.

In March 2001 Ghent joined Forest Green Rovers where he made 2 appearances for the club as well as sitting on the bench for the club in the 2001 FA Trophy final where Rovers lost out 1–0 against Canvey Island. Ghent then joined Barnsley in August 2001. He joined Doncaster Rovers on loan in January 2002, but was injured in training with Barnsley damaging his knee and went on to have surgery and never played for Doncaster.

He was offered a short-term deal by Barnsley in May 2003, but rejected this due to the administration of Barnsley FC and financial reasons at that time.

After three years out of the professional game and taking time to consider his future after an interview where he stated "my love for the game has gone, but it's an easy paycheck", Ghent trialed with his local side Tamworth during the summer of 2006 before joining Sutton Town. He then rejoined Tamworth, making his first and only appearance for the club against York City in a 2–2 draw in October 2006.

He joined newly formed Solihull Moors in July 2007, but left in January 2008 Where he went on to retire playing only a further handful of games for a local side.

== Personal life ==
In 2006, Ghent was jailed for three months for attacking and then stalking his then girlfriend. Ghent kicked her in the stomach when she was pregnant with their child and throttled her because he didn't like the way she decorated the Christmas tree. Ghent frightened the mother-of-two into staying with him by threatening to slit her mum's throat.

In May 2013 it was reported that Ghent stalked his ex-girlfriend after she refused to go on a lavish holiday with him. He admitted harassing his ex-girlfriend but was handed a ten-week suspended prison sentence. Ghent was also given a restraining order banning him from contacting the victim and ordered to pay the victim £750 compensation as well as £135 costs. When sentencing Ghent, Deputy District Judge Elizabeth Harte branded the former goalkeeper a "true stalker".
