= Alan Wright =

English footballer (born 1971)

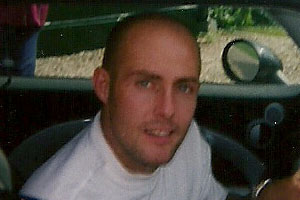
- Wright in 2000

Personal information
- Full name: Alan Geoffrey Wright
- Date of birth: 28 September 1971 (age 55)
- Place of birth: Ashton-under-Lyne, Lancashire, England
- Height: 5 ft 4 in (1.63 m)
- Position: Defender

Team information
- Current team: Manchester United U21 (assistant head coach)

Youth career
- Blackpool

Senior career*
Years	Team	Apps	(Gls)
1988–1991	Blackpool	98	(0)
1991–1995	Blackburn Rovers	74	(1)
1995–2003	Aston Villa	260	(5)
2003–2004	Middlesbrough	2	(0)
2003–2004	→ Sheffield United (loan)	9	(0)
2004–2007	Sheffield United	33	(1)
2006	→ Derby County (loan)	7	(0)
2006	→ Leeds United (loan)	1	(0)
2006–2007	→ Cardiff City (loan)	7	(0)
2007	→ Doncaster Rovers (loan)	3	(0)
2007	→ Nottingham Forest (loan)	9	(0)
2007–2009	Cheltenham Town	56	(1)
2009–2011	Fleetwood Town	55	(2)
Total		614	(10)

International career
1992	England U21	2	(0)

Managerial career
- 2012: Northwich Victoria
- 2013: Southport
- * Club domestic league appearances and goals

Alan Geoffrey Wright (born 28 September 1971) is an English professional football manager and former player who is currently the assistant head coach of the Manchester United Under-21s.

He was a left back who has played over 750 league and cup games for eight clubs, including an eight-year spell in the Premier League for Aston Villa. He has also played for Blackburn Rovers, Blackpool, Middlesbrough and Sheffield United plus he has had loan spells at Derby County, Leeds United, Cardiff City, Doncaster Rovers and Nottingham Forest. He finished his career with spells at Cheltenham Town and Fleetwood Town. He was capped twice by the England U21 team in 1992.

Following retirement Wright was part of the coaching staff at Blackpool before going on to have spells as manager of Northwich Victoria and Southport.

== Club career ==
=== Blackpool and Blackburn Rovers ===
Wright was born in Ashton-under-Lyne, Lancashire. He began his career as a trainee at Blackpool, for whom he made 98 league appearances between April 1988 and October 1991. The new Blackburn Rovers manager Kenny Dalglish noticed Wright, and brought him to Ewood Park as his first signing for £500,000, making him Blackpool's most expensive sale as well as the most expensive sale by any Fourth Division club.

He spent four years at Ewood Park, but, after the arrival of England left back Graeme Le Saux, made only 67 appearances, seven as a substitute. He left Blackburn just before they won the Premier League title in the 1994–95 season.

=== Aston Villa ===
Wright was signed from Blackburn Rovers for a fee of £1,000,000 in February 1995, brought to the club by then Villa manager Brian Little. Wright made an immediate impact.

His first goal for Aston Villa came later nearly a year after his arrival when he found the net against Middlesbrough, opening the scoring in a two-goal victory on New Year's Day 1996, in which Wright was also in a defence that kept a clean sheet. Wright scored one other goal that season, rounding off the scoring in a 3–0 home defeat of Leeds United. Wright was also part of the Aston Villa 1996 League Cup winning side, beating Leeds again, this time at Wembley.

In the 1996–97 season, Wright scored only once, this time against Wimbledon, scoring the second in a 2–0 win. Despite playing in the majority of the fixtures in the 1997–98 season, Wright failed to find the net. He appeared in the Aston Villa side that lost the 2000 FA Cup Final to Chelsea. With the emergence of the younger J Lloyd Samuel from the Villa academy, he transferred to Middlesbrough for free in August 2003.

To date, Wright is currently in third place in Aston Villa's European appearances list, having made 26 appearances between September 1996 (a draw with Helsingborgs IF) and July 2002 (a 2–0 loss to FC Zürich), behind Gordon Cowans and Dennis Mortimer on 29.

=== Sheffield United ===
Wright appeared only twice for Middlesbrough, one a 4–0 reverse at home to Arsenal, before being loaned out to Championship side Sheffield United on 31 October 2003, signing for them permanently on 12 January 2004. He scored his first goal for United in a 2–1 loss against Nottingham Forest on 3 April 2004.

Playing in the Championship, Wright continued his impressive disciplinary record (never sent off to date) and was also part of the Sheffield United side that upset Aston Villa 3–1 in the 3rd round of the FA Cup in the 2004–05 season. Wright made a couple of appearances for United at the start of the 2006–07 season, the last against Arsenal on 23 September 2006. Since then he was sent out on loan playing 1 game with Leeds United and seven games for Cardiff City. On 16 February 2007 he joined Doncaster Rovers on a month's loan.

Wright joined Nottingham Forest on loan until the end of the 2006–07 season in March 2007, where he linked up with former Aston Villa teammate Colin Calderwood, ostensibly as cover for the suspended Julian Bennett. Wright extended his loan with Nottingham Forest in May 2007 and played in the League One play-off semi-final against Yeovil Town, in which he scored an own goal. He was released by Sheffield United in May 2007.

=== Cheltenham Town ===
In July 2007, Wright was offered a trial by Oldham Athletic but eventually joined Cheltenham Town on non-contract basis on 8 October 2007. He subsequently signed a contract until the end of the 2007–08 season. He scored his first goal for Cheltenham in a 2–2 draw with Crewe Alexandra on 27 October 2007.

=== Fleetwood Town ===
In July 2009, Wright signed for Conference North outfit Fleetwood Town. During his first season for Fleetwood he played over 30 matches for the club including all 3 play-off matches to help the club win promotion to Conference National for the first time in their history. The club finished 2nd, 1 point behind winners Southport.

He was not offered a new contract at the end of the 2010–11 season and was released, along with a number of other players.

== International career ==
Wright played for the England U21s twice in 1992. He was also called up to Terry Venables' England squad in January 1996 and April 1996, but ultimately was never capped for the senior side.

== Coaching career ==
In June 2011, Wright was named as a coach at Blackpool F.C.'s Centre of Excellence. He went on to become assistant manager during Steve Thompson's spell as caretaker manager in 2013.

Wright was appointed assistant manager to Paul Simpson at non-league Northwich Victoria in February 2012 and worked in this role alongside existing duties at Blackpool. However, he departed after only a month to accept a job in Portugal.

On 21 February 2012 against Rushall Olympic, Wright took control in Simpson's absence. Wright remained in his role as assistant manager to incoming manager Martin Foyle. At the end of the 2011–12 season Wright became the caretaker manager after Foyle's departure to Hereford United, leaving the role after Lee Ashcroft was given the job full-time.

On 15 May 2013, Wright was appointed Southport manager, succeeding Liam Watson who resigned to take over at Telford United. He appointed John Hills as his assistant manager. Wright's first signing for Southport was ex Barrow and Fleetwood Town goalkeeper Danny Hurst.

== Personal life ==
His position was left back, and he is known for being one of the shortest players in Premier League history standing at only 5 feet 4 inches tall hence his popular nickname 'the mighty atom'.

Wright was inducted into the Hall of Fame at Bloomfield Road, when it was officially opened by former Blackpool player Jimmy Armfield in April 2006. Organised by the Blackpool Supporters' Association, Blackpool fans around the world voted on their all-time heroes. Five players from each decade are inducted; Wright is in the 1980s.

== Honours ==
Blackburn Rovers

- Football League Second Division play-offs: 1992

Aston Villa

- Football League Cup: 1995–96
- FA Cup runner-up: 1999–2000

Individual

- PFA Team of the Year: 1995–96 Premier League
