= Peter Enckelman =

Finnish footballer (born 1977)

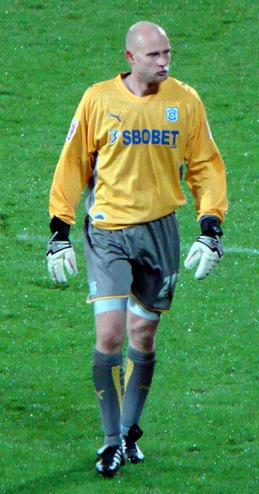
- Enckelman in 2009

Personal information
- Full name: Peter Mikael Enckelman
- Date of birth: 10 March 1977 (age 49)
- Place of birth: Turku, Finland
- Height: 6 ft 2 in (1.88 m)
- Position: Goalkeeper

Senior career*
Years	Team	Apps	(Gls)
1995–1999	TPS Turku	72	(0)
1999–2004	Aston Villa	52	(0)
2003	→ Blackburn Rovers (loan)	0	(0)
2004–2008	Blackburn Rovers	2	(0)
2008	→ Cardiff City (loan)	16	(0)
2008–2010	Cardiff City	16	(0)
2010–2012	St Johnstone	54	(0)
2012–2013	Heart of Midlothian	1	(0)
2013–2014	IFK Mariehamn	9	(0)
Total		222	(0)

International career
	Finland U21	15	(0)
2000–2010	Finland	12	(0)
- * Club domestic league appearances and goals

Peter Mikael Enckelman (born 10 March 1977) is a Finnish former professional footballer who played as a goalkeeper. He represented Finland and played for TPS Turku, Aston Villa, Blackburn Rovers, Cardiff City, St Johnstone, Heart of Midlothian and IFK Mariehamn.

== Club career ==
=== Aston Villa ===
Born in Turku, Varsinais-Suomi, Enckelman signed for his first English club, Aston Villa, from his hometown team, TPS Turku, in February 1999 for a fee of around €1 million (1,7m + 4,3m Finnish markka). He made his debut during a 3–1 defeat against Arsenal on 11 September 1999 as a second-half substitute, his first start coming three days later against Chester City in the League Cup.

After David James left the team, Enckelman was pleased when he was called upon in some of the later fixtures, as he expected to be seeing some more first-team action. However, the signing of former Manchester United goalkeeper Peter Schmeichel put a considerable damper on things, as, apart from the matches in Aston Villa's Intertoto Cup campaign of that season, he was left with virtually no playing time. It was only when Graham Taylor took over as manager that Enckelman was installed as first-choice keeper, as Schmeichel was sold to Manchester City.

Enckelman was the culprit for a defensive error in a hotly contested local derby (Birmingham City v Aston Villa (3–0) on 16 September 2002); as Olof Mellberg took a quick defensive throw-in to the keeper, Enckelman took his eye off the ball and as he was unable to control it, it slid under his foot and rolled in to the goal. There is some debate over whether the goal should have stood, as the laws state that a goal cannot be scored directly from a throw-in. The ball was adjudged to, yet did not appear to, scrape against the studs of his boot. Enckelman has stated on numerous occasions that he did not touch the ball prior to it entering the net. The incident led to further controversy when a rival fan charged onto the pitch and approached Enckelman, before making an offensive gesture directly to his face. The fan was later arrested and jailed, and Enckelman was praised for his refusal to retaliate.

=== Blackburn Rovers ===
Enckelman was sold to Blackburn Rovers in 2004 for £150,000. At Blackburn, he was considered second choice behind Brad Friedel, and on 19 May 2008 after making just three appearances in four years, he was told that his contract with the club would not be renewed.

=== Cardiff City ===
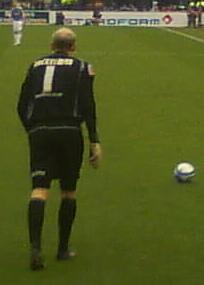
Enckelman taking a free-kick during a league match

On 10 January 2008, he joined Football League Championship side Cardiff City on loan until the end of the 2007–08 season becoming Cardiff's third loan goalkeeper of the year after Ross Turnbull and Kasper Schmeichel. He made his debut for Cardiff on 29 January as a substitute in a 3–1 victory over Queens Park Rangers after Michael Oakes was forced to be taken off after taking a blow to the face. He remained the club's first choice goalkeeper for the rest of the season, playing in four of the club's FA Cup matches, including the 2008 FA Cup Final, but a mistake from Enckelman resulted in the only goal of the game for opponents Portsmouth.

==== 2008–09 season ====
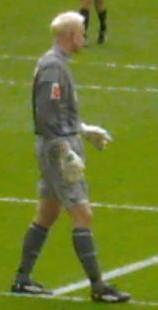
Enckelman in 2008.

Enckelman was released on his return to Blackburn at the end of the season and signed a two-year deal with Cardiff. Despite spending his loan spell as first choice goalkeeper, he started the 2008–09 season as second choice goalkeeper to loanee Tom Heaton. On 23 September, he made his first appearance of the season in a 1–0 loss to Swansea City in the League Cup, the first South Wales derby to take place in seven years. His first league appearance of the season came on 22 November when he replaced Tom Heaton during a 2–1 defeat against Plymouth Argyle after Heaton sustained a calf injury. In the following match, Enckelman was handed a start in place of Heaton and went on to remain unbeaten for over ten matches, including keeping a clean sheet during a 0–0 draw in the fourth round of the FA Cup against Arsenal when forced to undergo a knee operation. It was originally thought that the injury would keep him out for two months but Enckelman's knee failed to respond to the surgery meaning he would miss the remainder of the season.

==== 2009–10 season ====
The following season, Enckelman faced another challenge to be the number one goalkeeper at Cardiff with the signing of Scottish international David Marshall from Norwich City. After sharing goalkeeping duties during pre-season, he started the season on the bench behind Marshall before making his first appearance of the season in a 3–1 win over Dagenham & Redbridge in the first round of the League Cup. On 28 November 2009, Enckelman was involved in car crash but made a "lucky escape", he made his first league appearance the following day, playing 45 minutes coming on as a second-half substitute for David Marshall. At the end of the season, he was one of five players released by the club.

=== St Johnstone ===
On 7 August 2010, Enckelman appeared as a trialist for St Johnstone in their friendly match against Real Valladolid, keeping a clean sheet in the process. Two days later, Enckelman agreed to join the club, signing a two-year deal. He made his debut for the club in a 1–1 draw against Hearts on 14 August 2010. At St Johnstone, he immediately became a first choice goalkeeper. At the beginning of the season, Enckelman made a bad start and was relegated to the substitution bench after two matches. In his first season, Enckelman faced competition from Graeme Smith to take the first choice. In the end, Enckelman managed to win the spot. Despite the following season when Smith left and Alan Mannus arrived, Enckelman managed to retain his first choice throughout the season. Enckelman made an impressive penalty save from Kris Commons and won 1–0 against Celtic, keeping a clean sheet on 22 August 2011. After the match, Enckelman said the game was his best match. He saved another penalty from Jamie Hamill in a 2–1 win at Hearts on 3 December 2011. After the 2011–12 season, Enckelman was released by the club after his contract expired. After his release, Enckelman went on a trial at Preston and played in a friendly match in a 2–0 win over Southport on 14 July 2012.

=== Heart of Midlothian ===
On 17 August 2012, Enckelman signed a short-term deal with Hearts, until January 2013. Hearts signed Enckelman as cover after Mark Ridgers suffered an injury playing for the Scotland under-21 team. After being on the bench as cover for first choice Jamie MacDonald, Enckelman made his debut, coming on in the 14th minute for McDonald after he collided with Charlie Mulgrew. However, he lost his debut when Georgios Samaras scored through Enckelman's legs to give Celtic the lead 1–0 and the game stayed that way until the final whistle. After the match, Enckelman expressed 'disappointment' that he could have saved the shot from Samaras. Enckelman did not make another appearance for Hearts and he was released at the end of his contract in January 2013.

=== Return to Finland ===
On 13 June 2013, it was announced that Enckelman had signed a short-term contract with Veikkausliiga side IFK Mariehamn, returning to his native Finland after spending 14 years abroad.

== International career ==
Enckelman was capped 15 times by the Finland national under-21 team, before being capped on 12 occasions by the Finland national team from 2000 to 2010.

== Personal life ==
He is the son of Göran Enckelman, also a former Finland international goalkeeper. He has a keen interest in motorsport, and in January 2007 the Encke Sport team was announced with plans to contest the British Touring Car Championship. This never happened, but the team has competed in smaller racing classes.

== Career statistics ==
=== Club ===
Appearances and goals by club, season and competition
Club	Season	League			National cup		League cup		Europe		Total	
Club	Season	Division	Apps	Goals	Apps	Goals	Apps	Goals	Apps	Goals	Apps	Goals
TPS	1995	Veikkausliiga	7	0	—		—		0	0	7	0
TPS	1996	Veikkausliiga	17	0	—		—		—		17	0
TPS	1997	Veikkausliiga	24	0	—		—		2 (Note: Includes UEFA Intertoto Cup)	0	26	0
TPS	1998	Veikkausliiga	24	0	—		—		4	0	28	0
TPS	Total		72	0	—		—		6	0	78	0
Aston Villa	1999–00	Premier League	10	0	1	0	3	0	—		14	0
Aston Villa	2000–01	Premier League	0	0	0	0	0	0	—		0	0
Aston Villa	2001–02	Premier League	9	0	0	0	0	0	5	0	14	0
Aston Villa	2002–03	Premier League	33	0	0	0	3	0	4	0	40	0
Aston Villa	2003–04	Premier League	0	0	0	0	0	0	—		0	0
Aston Villa	Total		52	0	1	0	6	0	9	0	68	0
Blackburn Rovers (loan)	2003–04	Premier League	0	0	—		—		—		0	0
Blackburn Rovers	2003–04	Premier League	2	0	—		—		—		2	0
Blackburn Rovers	2004–05	Premier League	0	0	0	0	1	0	—		1	0
Blackburn Rovers	2005–06	Premier League	0	0	0	0	0	0	—		0	0
Blackburn Rovers	2006–07	Premier League	0	0	0	0	0	0	0	0	0	0
Blackburn Rovers	2007–08	Premier League	0	0	0	0	0	0	0	0	0	0
Blackburn Rovers	Blackburn total		2	0	0	0	1	0	0	0	3	0
Cardiff City (loan)	2007–08	Championship	16	0	4	0	—		—		20	0
Cardiff City	2008–09	Championship	12	0	2	0	1	0	—		15	0
Cardiff City	2009–10	Championship	4	0	0	0	3	0	—		7	0
Cardiff City	Cardiff total		32	0	6	0	4	0	—		42	0
St Johnstone	2010–11	Scottish Premier League	29	0	5	0	1	0	—		35	0
St Johnstone	2011–12	Scottish Premier League	25	0	2	0	2	0	—		29	0
St Johnstone	Total		54	0	7	0	3	0	—		64	0
Hearts of Midlothian	2012–13	Scottish Premier League	1	0	0	0	0	0	0	0	1	0
IFK Mariehamn	2013	Veikkausliiga	9	0	1	0	—		2 (Note: Includes UEFA Europa League)	0	12	0
Career total			222	0	15	0	13	0	17	0	267	0

=== International ===
Appearances and goals by national team and year
National team	Year	Apps	Goals
Finland	2000	1	0
Finland	2001	2	0
Finland	2002	0	0
Finland	2003	2	0
Finland	2004	0	0
Finland	2005	1	0
Finland	2006	1	0
Finland	2007	0	0
Finland	2008	4	0
Finland	2009	0	0
Finland	2010	1	0
Total		12	0

== Honours ==
Aston Villa

- UEFA Intertoto Cup: 2001
- FA Cup runner-up: 1999–2000

Cardiff City

- FA Cup runner-up: 2007–08
