= Neil Tarrant =

British footballer

Personal information
- Full name: Neil Kenneth Tarrant
- Date of birth: 24 June 1979 (age 47)
- Place of birth: Darlington, England
- Position: Forward

Senior career*
Years	Team	Apps	(Gls)
1996–1997	Darlington	0	(0)
1997	Shamrock Rovers	2	(0)
1997–1999	Ross County	44	(20)
1999–2001	Aston Villa	2	(0)
1999–2000	→ Ayr United (loan)	15	(4)
2000	→ York City (loan)	7	(1)
2001	→ Motherwell (loan)	5	(0)
2001–2002	Ross County	6	(0)
2002	Boston Utd	14	(5)
2002–2003	Barrow	21	(11)
2003–2004	Drogheda United	9	(3)
2003–2004	Raufoss	29	(12)
2005–2006	Barrow	18	(7)
2006	Workington	14	(8)
2006	Gateshead	15	(10)
2006–2007	Newcastle Blue Star	19	(10)
	Sunderland Nissan	32	(22)
2009–2010	Dunston UTS	21	(11)
2010–2011	Northallerton Town	15	(7)
2011	Darlington Railway Athletic	36	(21)
Total		322	(152)

International career
1999–2000	Scotland U-21	5	(0)
- * Club domestic league appearances and goals

Neil Tarrant (born 24 June 1979) is a footballer who played for a variety of British clubs including Ross County, Aston Villa and Ayr United, and the Scotland national under-21 football team.

== Club career ==
Tarrant signed for Shamrock Rovers in August 1997 but only made 2 substitute appearances before being released in November. He made his debut on 17 October at the Hoops temporary home at the time Tolka Park.

Tarrant won the Scottish Third Division at Ross County in 1998-99 and was voted SPFA Players' Player of the Year for the Third Division that season. He holds the record for the highest transfer fee received in the Scottish Third Division at a reported £250,000 from when he moved to Aston Villa.

In his time at Ayr United, Tarrant reached the Scottish Cup semi-final.

He went on to win the Football Conference in 2001-02 whilst playing for Boston United.

== International career ==
Tarrant won five caps for the Scotland national under-21 football team.
