= Southwark College =

Coordinates: 51.5033°N 0.1058°W

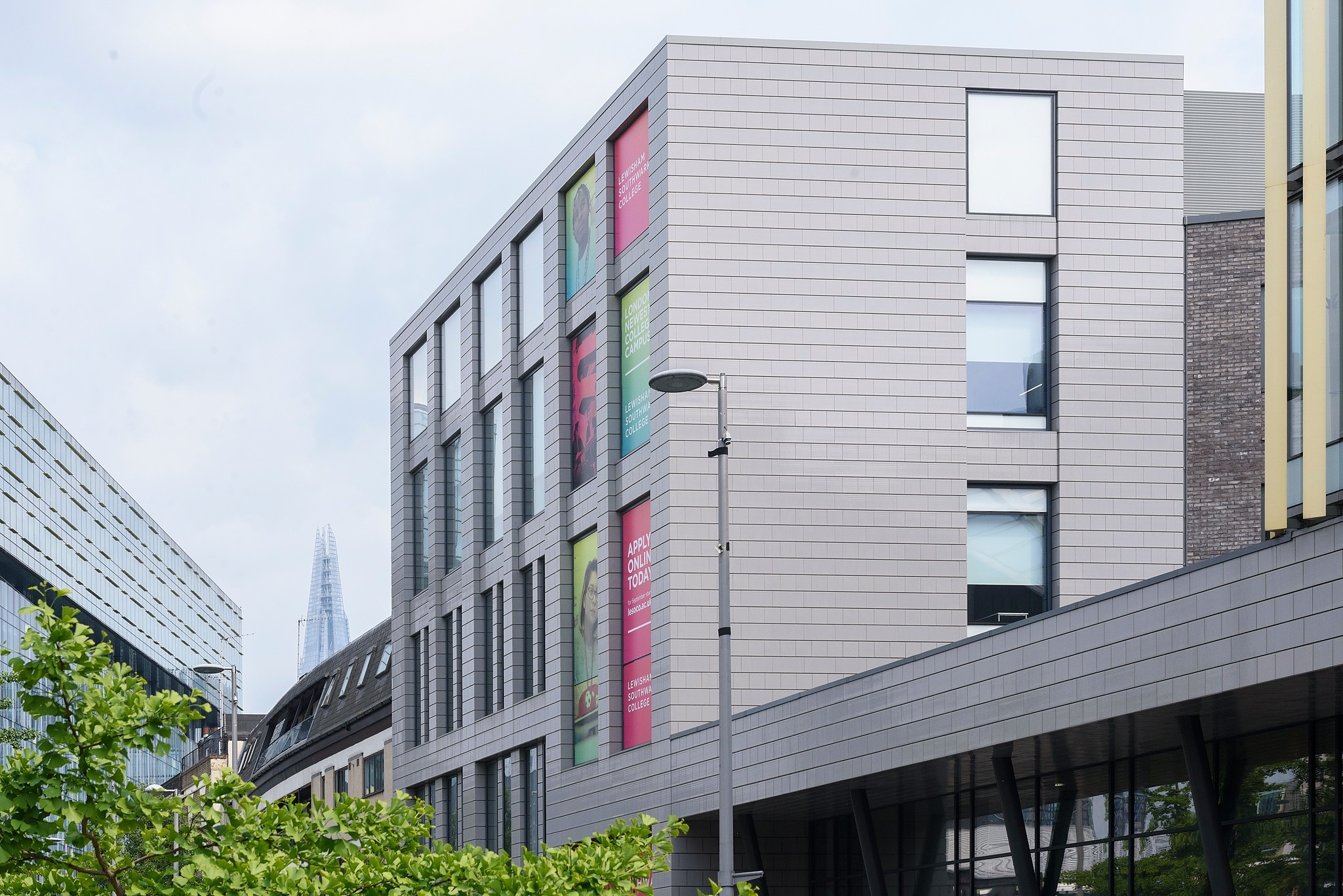

Location
- 25, The Cut, London; London, SE1 8LF; England

Information
- Type: Further education college
- Established: 1990 – Southwark College; 2012 – constituent college of Lewisham Southwark College; 2017 – constituent college of Newcastle College Group
- Local authority: London Borough of Southwark
- Department for Education URN: 130417 Tables
- Ofsted: Reports
- Age: 14+
- Website: www.southwark.ac.uk

Southwark College is a further education college located in the London Borough of Southwark. The college at one time had seven sites; it is now based at a building on The Cut, opposite Southwark tube station. The college has been part of Newcastle College Group since 2017.

== Courses ==
The college offers GCSE, ESOL, Access, City & Guilds and BTEC courses in many subjects. It also offers higher education courses including an MBA.

== History ==
The college was formed in the early 1990s by a merger between a sixth form college, a further education college, and the local adult education centre. Its main site for a long time was a purpose-built 1960s centre near London Waterloo station.

In 2006 the college had a total of 10,093 students enrolled. 2515 of the total students enrolled at the college were on a full-time program and 7578 students were enrolled onto a part-time program. The college also had 200 14- to 16-year-old students enrolled. 62% of the students were female and 38% were male.

Southwark College merged with Lewisham College in 2012, having previously existed as separate institutions. Between 2013 and 2014 the college was branded as LeSoCo, before this was dropped. It was then known as Lewisham Southwark College between 2014 and 2018, becoming part of Newcastle College Group in 2017. In October 2018 it was announced by Newcastle College Group (NCG) that Lewisham Southwark College would return to being two separate institutions: Lewisham College and Southwark College.

== Honours ==
In 2017 Southwark College (along with Lewisham College) was placed in the top ten percent of FE Colleges (based on the national achievement rate tables) at 89%. In 2018 this rose to 90%.

== Notable alumni ==
- Edward Downman, Anglican clergyman and antiquary
- Clive Efford, Labour MP for Eltham
- Nick Petford, vice chancellor, University of Northampton
- Prab Panesar, CEO, Universal Exports
- Sue Black, OBE, computer scientist
