= Rhythm + Flow =

Netflix music reality television series

- Genre: Reality-TV
- Created by: Jeff Gaspin; Jesse Collins; Mike Jackson; Ty Stiklorius; Nikki Boella; John Legend
- Directed by: Sam Wrench
- Judges: Season 1 T.I. Chance the Rapper; Cardi B Season 2 Ludacris; DJ Khaled; Latto
- Country of origin: United States
- No. of seasons: 2
- No. of episodes: 14

Production
- Executive producers: Jeff Gaspin; Jesse Collins; John Legend; Mike Jackson; Ty Stiklorius; Jeff Pollack; Nikki Boella
- Production companies: Gaspin Media; Get Lifted Film Company; Jesse Collins Entertainment

Original release
- Network: Netflix
- Release: October 9, 2019 – December 4, 2024

Rhythm + Flow is a music reality television series on Netflix which premiered on October 9, 2019. It is Netflix's first original music competition program.

In the series, prominent hip-hop artists critique, mentor, and judge unsigned rappers, who are competing to win a US$250,000 prize. In several episodes, the judges are joined by guest judges, who give the competitors additional feedback.

Season 1 featured artists Cardi B, Chance the Rapper, and T.I. as the main judges. After multiple delays in production, Season 2 began airing on November 20, 2024, with a new panel of judges featuring DJ Khaled, Ludacris, and Latto.

== Development ==
Rhythm + Flow is the first music competition show developed for Netflix. Because Netflix is not subject to the same censorship regulations as normal broadcast television, competitors were not asked to censor profanity in their lyrics.

Rather than a recording contract, a typical prize in other music competitions, the winner is awarded a US$250,000 cash prize.

== Season 1 judges ==
- Cardi B, an American rapper, actress and television personality
- Chance the Rapper, an American rapper, singer, songwriter, actor and activist
- T.I., an American rapper, record producer, songwriter, actor, record executive and entrepreneur
- Snoop Dogg

== Season 2 judges ==
- DJ Khaled, an American DJ, record producer, and record executive.
- Latto, an American rapper and singer
- Ludacris, an American rapper and actor
- Detroit rappers Eminem, Royce da 5'9", Big Sean, & Mr. Porter

== Season 1 competitors ==
Name	Result
D Smoke	Winner
Flawless Real Talk	Runner-Up
Londynn B	Third Place
Troyman	Fourth Place
Caleb Colossus	5th
Sam Be Yourself	6th
Ali Tomineek	7th
Big Mouf'bo	8th
Old Man Saxon	9th

== Season 2 competitors ==
Name	Result
DreTL	Winner
Jay Taj	Runner-Up
Sura Ali	3rd
Detroit Diamond	4th
Jaxs	5th
Tia P.	6th
Yoshi Vintage	7th
Rhome (v. Jay Taj)	eliminated in Battle Round
K'Alley (v. DreTL)	eliminated in Battle Round
Būnduke (v. Yoshi Vintage)	eliminated in Battle Round
Honie Gold (v. Tia P.)	eliminated in Battle Round
LG (v. Jaxs)	eliminated in Battle Round
SeeFour (v. Sura Ali)	eliminated in Battle Round
Dono (v. Detroit Diamond)	eliminated in Battle Round
Chyng Diamond, Cody Ray, Jaywop, Lex Lane, Malaynah, Mizzy, Quin Jaye, Tony Da Kidd	eliminated in Cypher Round

== Release ==
The first four episodes of Rhythm + Flow were released on October 9, 2019, on Netflix. Three more episodes were released on October 16. The final three were released on October 23. In most Netflix series, all episodes of a season are released at once. Rhythm + Flow uses a more staggered release schedule to approximate the format of a traditional music competition show and build anticipation before the winner is announced.

== Episodes ==
Season	Episodes	Originally released	
Season	Episodes	First released	Last released
1	10	October 9, 2019	October 23, 2019
2	10	November 20, 2024	December 4, 2024

=== Season 1 (2019) ===
No. overall	No. in season	Title	Guest judges	Original release date
1	1	"Los Angeles Auditions"	Snoop Dogg, Anderson .Paak, Nipsey Hussle	October 9, 2019
2	2	"New York Auditions"	Fat Joe, Jadakiss	October 9, 2019
3	3	"Atlanta Auditions"	Killer Mike, Quavo, Big Boi	October 9, 2019
4	4	"Chicago Auditions"	Twista, Royce da 5'9", Lupe Fiasco	October 9, 2019
5	5	"Cyphers"	None	October 16, 2019
6	6	"Rap Battles"	Smack	October 16, 2019
7	7	"Music Videos"	None	October 16, 2019
8	8	"Samples"	DJ Khaled	October 23, 2019
9	9	"Collaborations"	Miguel, Ty Dolla $ign, Jhené Aiko, Tory Lanez, Teyana Taylor	October 23, 2019
10	10	"Finale"	Hit-Boy, Tay Keith, London on da Track, Sounwave	October 23, 2019

=== Season 2 (2024) ===
No. overall	No. in season	Title	Guest judges	Original release date
11	1	"Opportunity Meets Preparation"	Big Sean	November 20, 2024
12	2	"Borderline Disrespectful"	Big Sean, Busta Rhymes	November 20, 2024
13	3	"Secure Your Slot (Cyphers)"	Busta Rhymes, Remy Ma	November 20, 2024
14	4	"Greatness is Greatness (Cyphers)"	Remy Ma	November 20, 2024
15	5	"Your Favorite Rapper's Favorite Rapper (Battles)"	Eminem, Royce da 5'9", Mr. Porter	November 27, 2024
16	6	"Points for Originality (Singles)"	Eminem, GloRilla	November 27, 2024
17	7	"Be Good or Be Great (Singles)"	GloRilla	November 27, 2024
18	8	"Boss Up (Collabs)"	GloRilla, D Smoke	December 4, 2024
19	9	"Stay Humble (Collabs)"	D Smoke	December 4, 2024
20	10	"Left It On The Floor (Finals)"	John Legend, 30 Roc, Hitmaka, Derrick Milano, Bangladesh	December 4, 2024

== Accolades ==
Award	Year (Note: Indicates the year of ceremony. Each year is linked to the article about the awards held that year, wherever possible.)	Category	Result	Ref.
HipHopDX Awards	2019	Best TV Show of the Year	Won	
51st NAACP Image Awards	2020	Outstanding Reality Program, Reality Competition Series or Game Show	Won	

== Adaptations ==
Netflix released a French version of the show in June 2022, named "Nouvelle École" (which translates to New School) in France and was branded "Rhythm + Flow France" in Europe, which consisted of a first season of eight episodes. Judges for this spin-off were Marseille based SCH, Paris based Niska and Bruxelles based Shay. The winner of the first season is Fresh LaPeufra, who won by his strong and efficient rap. The single of Fresh from the final “Chop” had a real success in France, reaching 43 million views on YouTube. The show was renewed for a second season in July 2022. The second season, which features the same three judges, also consists of eight episodes that started airing in May 2023.

An Italian adaptation was announced on June 7, 2023. It was released in February 2024, with judges consisted of Fabri Fibra, Geolier, and Rose Villain.

A Polish adaptation of the series was released on May 14, 2025, with Bedoes 2115, Dziarma and Sokół as judges.
