= Anne-Marie Kilday =

British historian and academic administrator

Anne-Marie Kilday is a British academic. In August 2022 she became vice chancellor of the University of Northampton, succeeding Nick Petford. She is a professor of criminal history.

== Education and career ==
Kilday was a student at the University of St Andrews. She went on to study for a PhD at the University of Strathclyde, supervised by T. M. Devine, and became an academic at Oxford Brookes University. At Oxford Brookes, she was head of the History Department, dean of the Faculty of Humanities and Social Sciences, and pro vice-chancellor for student and staff experience, before moving to the University of Northampton as vice chancellor.

== Administrative actions ==
In December 2023, under Kilday's leadership the University of Northampton announced the closure of the Institute for Creative Leather Technology.

== Books ==
Kilday is the author or co-author of:

- Women and Violent Crime in Enlightenment Scotland (Royal Historical Soc., 2007)
- Cultures of Shame: Exploring Crime and Morality in Britain, 1600—1900 (with David Nash, Palgrave Macmillan, 2010)
- A History of Infanticide in Britain, c. 1600 to the Present (Palgrave Macmillan, 2013)
- Crime in Scotland 1660–1960: The Violent North? (Routledge, 2019)
- Beyond Deviant Damsels: Re-evaluating Female Criminality in the Nineteenth Century (with David Nash, Oxford University Press, 2023)

She is an editor of:

- Histories of Crime: Britain 1600–2000 (edited with David Nash, Bloomsbury, 2010)
- Law, Crime and Deviance since 1700: Micro-Studies in the History of Crime (edited with David Nash, Bloomsbury, 2017)
- Murder and Mayhem: Crime in Twentieth-Century Britain (edited with David Nash, Bloomsbury, 2018)
- Fair and Unfair Trials in the British Isles, 1800-1940: Microhistories of Justice and Injustice (edited with David Nash, Bloomsbury, 2020)
