= Jingle Jangle: A Christmas Journey =

- Official release poster
- Directed by: David E. Talbert
- Written by: David E. Talbert
- Produced by: Lyn Sisson-Talbert; David E. Talbert; Kristin Burr; John Legend; Mike Jackson; David McIlvain
- Starring: Forest Whitaker; Madalen Mills; Keegan-Michael Key; Hugh Bonneville; Anika Noni Rose; Phylicia Rashad; Lisa Davina Phillip; Ricky Martin
- Cinematography: Remi Adefarasin
- Edited by: Michael Tronick; Joe Galdo; Virginia Katz
- Music by: John Debney
- Production companies: Golden Girl; Brillstein Entertainment Partners; Burr Productions; Get Lifted Film Company; 260 Degrees Entertainment
- Distributed by: Netflix
- Release date: November 13, 2020
- Running time: 122 minutes
- Country: United States
- Language: English

Jingle Jangle: A Christmas Journey is a 2020 American Christmas musical fantasy film written and directed by David E. Talbert. Choreographed by Ashley Wallen, it stars Forest Whitaker, Keegan-Michael Key, Hugh Bonneville, Anika Noni Rose, Phylicia Rashad, Lisa Davina Phillip, Ricky Martin, and Madalen Mills. The film, which was originally planned as a stage production, received 10 nominations at the 52nd NAACP Image Awards, which was the overall most to be held by a motion picture tied with Black Panther and The Best Man in previous years. This record was succeeded by The Color Purple who surpassed the number of nominations four years later. The film was released on Netflix on November 13, 2020.

== Plot ==
In industrial England, Jeronicus Jangle — an inventor, toymaker, and owner of Jangles and Things — receives the final component to his latest invention that he believes will change his and his family's lives forever. This component can bring toys to life, the first being matador doll Don Juan Diego.

Jeronicus celebrates Christmas with his family, after he tells apprentice and aspiring inventor Gustafson he will look at his twirly whirly tomorrow leaving Diego and the store under the care of Gustafson. When Diego discovers and becomes distraught upon learning he will be mass-produced, thus robbing him of his uniqueness, he then coerces Gustafson into getting back at Jeronicus by stealing himself and his book of inventions.

Without proof of Gustafson's actions to show to the police, Jangles and Things falls into financial hardship when Jeronicus's stolen book of invention makes Gustafson create his own factory. After his wife Joanne's death, Jeronicus grows distant from and neglects his daughter Jessica, who grows older and moves away. Thirty years later, Jangles and Things has become a failing pawnbroker shop and Jeronicus has completely lost his creative spark. He is regularly visited by postwoman Ms. Johnston, both sympathetic and smitten with him, who tries to lift his spirits. Jeronicus is also visited by banker Mr. Delacroix, who warns him to pay his debts. As an alternative, Jeronicus can produce a new invention to show to the bank by Christmas; otherwise, he will lose his shop.

Meanwhile, Jessica is shown to now have a life of her own and a young daughter named Journey who shares Jeronicus' passion for inventing. A letter arrives for Jessica from Jeronicus, so she sends Journey to stay with him until Christmas. Upon arriving, Jeronicus seems uninterested in her, though agrees to let her stay. Now a famous toy tycoon, Gustafson has exhausted all inventions from Jeronicus' book. At a party, he unveils a toy of his own design that he has been trying to perfect called the Twirly Whirly, which malfunctions and attacks one of the guests. Diego convinces Gustafson to steal another invention from Jeronicus.

Jeronicus is busy working on his next toy, The Buddy 3000, which Journey discovers was conceived and designed by Jessica, and she resolves to get it to work. That night, Journey is caught in Jeronicus' workshop by his assistant Edison. Together, they find Buddy's body, and after putting in the mechanism that Jeronicus was working on, Buddy comes to life. Jeronicus hears the commotion and enters, causing Buddy to shut down. After sending Journey to bed, he laments about his estrangement from his daughter, the loss of his wife, and the memories with them.

Journey and Edison later discover Buddy has been stolen by Gustafson. They sneak into his factory, where his unveiling of Buddy fails. Gustafson orders Buddy destroyed, though Journey and Edison retrieve it in time. After finding out that Journey and Edison have gone missing, Jeronicus goes to the factory. With help from Jeronicus and Buddy, Journey and Edison are able to escape the factory, though Buddy is severely damaged in the process. Ms. Johnston arrives to help them escape Gustafson and his guards.

Journey reveals to Jeronicus that she wrote to Jessica on his behalf, wanting to get to know him. He gets to work on fixing Buddy, to do right by Journey and Jessica, who arrives in town to retrieve Journey. Jessica confronts Jeronicus over his neglect of her, though he unveils hundreds of letters he wrote her but could not bring himself to send. After making amends, Jessica helps Jeronicus fix Buddy overnight.

Jeronicus and his family are confronted by Gustafson, Diego, and the police, and accused of stealing Buddy from him, though Journey disproves this. Jeronicus removes the life-giving component from Diego for reprogramming. As Gustafson is arrested, Jeronicus gives Gustafson the missing component for his Twirly Whirly he wrapped to give him years back, if only he had been patient. Mr. Delacroix arrives in the store and sees Buddy, and promises to give Jeronicus funding for any invention he desires to make.

The story is shown to be told by an older Journey to her grandchildren and she unveils the still functional Buddy to them. She flies them to the Jangle-owned factory where Gustafson's factory once stood.

At the end credits, a book montage of Jangles and Things going back into business, Gustafson finally perfecting his Twirly Whirly in his cell, Diego being mass-produced, and the opening of Jangle's factory.

== Cast ==
- Forest Whitaker as Jeronicus, a toymaker and inventor
  - Justin Cornwell as Young Jeronicus
- Madalen Mills as Journey, the granddaughter of Jeronicus
  - Phylicia Rashad as Grandmother Journey
- Keegan-Michael Key as Gustafson, the former apprentice of Jeronicus
  - Miles Barrow as Young Gustafson
- Hugh Bonneville as Mr. Delacroix, a banker
- Anika Noni Rose as Jessica, the daughter of Jeronicus and the mother of Journey
  - Diana Babnicova as Young Jessica
- Ricky Martin as the voice of Don Juan Diego, a sentient matador doll
  - Jonny Labey provides the motion capture of Don Juan Diego
- Lisa Davina Phillip as Ms. Johnston, a postwoman
  - Marisha Wallace as Ms. Johnston's singing voice
- Kieron L. Dyer as Edison, Jeronicus' assistant
- Sharon Rose as Joanne, Jeronicus' wife
- Abraham Popoola as Rogers
- Tobias Poppe as the voice of Buddy 3000, a toy robot created by Jeronicus
- Momo Yeung as Toy Buyer #2

== Production ==
On December 7, 2017, Netflix bought a pitch from David E. Talbert entitled Jingle Jangle, with Talbert signed on to write and direct the Christmas musical. On September 17, 2018, it was announced that John Legend and Mike Jackson signed on as producers alongside David E. Talbert, and Lyn Sisson-Talbert for Brillstein Entertainment Partners. Ty Stiklorius will executive produce. In October 2018, Forest Whitaker joined the cast of the film. In April 2019, Keegan-Michael Key, Phylicia Rashad, Anika Noni Rose and Madalen Mills joined the cast. In July 2019, Hugh Bonneville joined the cast. In October 2020, it was revealed that Ricky Martin joined the cast.

The film's musical score includes songs by John Legend and Philip Lawrence.

Principal photography began in June 2019 in Norwich and Arborfield Studios, Berkshire.

== Music ==
All of the scores were composed by John Debney.

The leading two tracks from the Jingle Jangle: A Christmas Journey soundtrack are "This Day" performed by Usher and Kiana Ledé, which was also led by Usher who helped produced a 'Global Behind the Mic' version performed by the international voiceover cast from the film in different languages and "Square Root of Possible" performed by Madalen Mills, which was listed and considered a possible contender and sourced as a prediction of an Oscar nomination for the 2021 Academy Awards for Best Original Song by various entertainment news articles. Although it has been considered in the early tossup predictions, The Academy of Motion Picture Arts and Sciences announced that "Make It Work" made the shortlist for Best Original Song to be voted for a nomination as well as Best Original Score. However, each musical selections that were considered, did not make it into the official Oscar nominations. A special music video and remix recorded version of "Square Root of Possible" is performed by America's Got Talent's finalists, The Ndlovu Youth Choir of South Africa provided by Netflix YouTube channel for Africa, AfricaonNetflix.

== Reception ==
=== Critical response ===
On review aggregator Rotten Tomatoes, the film holds an approval rating of 89% based on 75 reviews, with an average rating of 7/10. The website's critics consensus reads, "Jingle Jangle: A Christmas Journey celebrates the yuletide season with a holiday adventure whose exuberant spirit is matched by its uplifting message." On Metacritic, it has a weighted average score of 69 out of 100 based on 15 critics, indicating "generally favorable" reviews.

Richard Roeper of Chicago Sun-Times gave the film 3.5 out of 4 stars and wrote, "So much movie packed into one story, but the universally appealing performances and the show-stopping musical numbers carry the day." Leah Greenblatt of Entertainment Weekly gave the film a B+ and described it as "a sprawling musical extravaganza whose candy-colored, dandily overstuffed revelry spills over with joy and jubilance and every other happy J-word."

=== Accolades ===
Award	Ceremony date	Category	Recipient(s)	Result	Ref
Black Reel Awards	April 11, 2021	Outstanding Costume Design	Michael Wilkinson	Won	
Black Reel Awards	April 11, 2021	Outstanding Original Score	John Debney	Nominated	
Black Reel Awards	April 11, 2021	Outstanding Original Song	"Make It Work" (John Legend, Anika Noni Rose and Forest Whitaker)	Nominated	
Black Reel Awards	April 11, 2021	Outstanding Production Design	Gavin Bocquet	Won	
Costume Designers Guild Awards	April 13, 2021	Excellence in Sci-Fi/Fantasy Film	Michael Wilkinson	Nominated	
Guild of Music Supervisors Awards	April 11, 2021	Best Music Supervision for Film (Budgeted Over $25 Million)	Julia Michaels	Nominated	
Guild of Music Supervisors Awards	April 11, 2021	Best Song Written and/or Recorded for a Film	“Make It Work” (John Legend, Julia Michaels, Anika Noni Rose and Forest Whitaker)	Nominated	
Hollywood Music in Media Awards	January 27, 2021	Best Soundtrack Album	Jingle Jangle: A Christmas Journey	Nominated	
NAACP Image Awards	March 27, 2021	Outstanding Motion Picture	Jingle Jangle: A Christmas Journey	Nominated	
NAACP Image Awards	March 27, 2021	Outstanding Actor in a Motion Picture	Forest Whitaker	Nominated	
NAACP Image Awards	March 27, 2021	Outstanding Actress in a Motion Picture	Madalen Mills	Nominated	
NAACP Image Awards	March 27, 2021	Outstanding Supporting Actress in a Motion Picture	Anika Noni Rose	Nominated	
NAACP Image Awards	March 27, 2021	Outstanding Supporting Actress in a Motion Picture	Phylicia Rashad	Won	
NAACP Image Awards	March 27, 2021	Outstanding Breakthrough Performance in a Motion Picture	Madalen Mills	Won	
NAACP Image Awards	March 27, 2021	Outstanding Ensemble Cast in a Motion Picture	Cast of Jingle Jangle: A Christmas Journey	Nominated	
NAACP Image Awards	March 27, 2021	Outstanding Soundtrack/Compilation Album	Various Artists, Jingle Jangle: A Christmas Journey	Nominated	
NAACP Image Awards	March 27, 2021	Outstanding Writing in a Motion Picture	David E. Talbert	Nominated	
NAACP Image Awards	March 27, 2021	Outstanding Directing in a Motion Picture	David E. Talbert	Nominated	
Visual Effects Society Awards	April 6, 2021	Outstanding Visual Effects in a Photoreal Feature	Brad Parker, Roma Van Den Bergh, Eric Guaglione, Carlos Monzon and Stefano Pepin	Nominated	
Visual Effects Society Awards	April 6, 2021	Outstanding Animated Character in a Photoreal Feature	Eric Guaglione, Shuchi Singhal, Adrien Annesley and Mahmoud Ellithy (for Don Juan Diego)	Nominated	

== Children's book ==
David E. Talbert and his wife, Lyn Sisson-Talbert, co-authored and released a 32-page picture book for children titled The Square Root of Possible: A Jingle Jangle Story in December 2020.

A second book, tilted The Perfect Gift: Jingle Jangle, Book 2 was released on October 12, 2021. It was also authored by Talbert and Sisson-Talbert.

== See also ==
- List of Christmas films
