= A Legendary Christmas with John and Chrissy =

- Genre: Christmas special Variety show
- Written by: Eliza Skinner; Jeff Stilson; Akilah Green
- Directed by: Ryan Polito
- Starring: John Legend; Chrissy Teigen
- Country of origin: United States
- Original language: English

Production
- Executive producers: John Legend; Chrissy Teigen; Katy Mullan; Erik Flannigan; Ty Stiklorius; Rob English; Mike Jackson
- Producers: Kristen Wong; Lee Loechler
- Running time: 40 minutes
- Production companies: Friends at Work; Done + Dusted; Universal Television

Original release
- Network: NBC
- Release: November 28, 2018

A Legendary Christmas with John and Chrissy is an American Christmas special variety show starring John Legend and Chrissy Teigen. The special premiered on November 28, 2018 on NBC.

== Synopsis ==
A Legendary Christmas with John and Chrissy presents John Legend and Chrissy Teigen joined by friends and family who stop by their home to celebrate the holidays. The special features Legend and Teigen doing festive activities like surprise caroling with friends and family, and also features Legend perform songs from his Christmas album, A Legendary Christmas.

== Cast ==
=== Main ===
- John Legend
- Chrissy Teigen
- The Legends (Legend's family)
- The Teigens (Teigen's family)
- Raphael Saadiq and the House Band

=== Guests ===
- Awkwafina
- Neal Brennan
- Darren Criss
- Zach Galifianakis
- Derek Hough
- Kris Jenner
- Kim Kardashian West
- Yassir Lester
- Jane Lynch
- Retta
- Sam Richardson
- Ben Schwartz
- Tien Tran
- Meghan Trainor
- Stevie Wonder

=== Cameos ===
- Kenan Thompson
- The Voice Coaches – Kelly Clarkson, Adam Levine and Blake Shelton
- Queer Eye's The Fab Five – Antoni Porowski, Tan France, Karamo Brown, Bobby Berk and Jonathan Van Ness
