= Jon Bewers =

English footballer (born 1982)

Jonny Bewers
Personal information
- Full name: Jonathan Anthony Bewers
- Date of birth: 10 September 1982 (age 44)
- Place of birth: Kettering, England
- Height: 1.73 m (5 ft 8 in)
- Positions: Defender; midfielder

Youth career
- FA National School of Excellence
- 1996–1999: Aston Villa

Senior career*
Years	Team	Apps	(Gls)
1999–2004	Aston Villa	1	(0)
2004	Notts County	3	(0)
2004	Walsall	1	(0)
2004–2005	Kidderminster Harriers	0	(0)
2005	Kettering Town		
2005–2006	Aylesbury United	14	(1)
2006	University of Northampton		
2006	Cogenhoe United		
2006–2008	Rothwell Town		
2008	Stamford		
2008–2009	→ Rothwell Corinthians (loan)	10	(1)
Total		29	(2)

International career
1999	England U16	3	(0)
2000	England U17	1	(0)
2002–2003	England U20	4	(0)
- * Club domestic league appearances and goals

Jonathan Anthony Bewers (born 10 September 1982) is an English former footballer born in Kettering, Northamptonshire, who briefly played in the Premier League for Aston Villa and in the Football League for Notts County and Walsall. He played as a defender or in midfield. Throughout his career, he has been known as Jonathan Bewers, Jon Bewers, Johny Bewers and currently Jonny Bewers.

== Career ==
Bewers came through the Football Association's National School of Excellence at Lilleshall, and began his club career as a schoolboy with Aston Villa. He turned professional in 1999, captained the club's reserve team as a 17-year-old, and made his first-team debut as a late substitute in the Premier League game against Tottenham Hotspur at White Hart Lane on 15 April 2000. Villa won the game 4–2. He was on the bench as Aston Villa won the 2001 UEFA Intertoto Cup.

However, although Bewers remained at Villa for another four years, that was his last first-team appearance. After trials with Macclesfield Town and AFC Bournemouth, he was released in March 2004 to join Notts County until the end of the season. He made three appearances from the substitutes' bench, but failed to earn himself a contract extension. Bewers had another trial with Bournemouth in July 2004, before joining Walsall on non-contract terms in September. He made just one appearance before being released to join Kidderminster Harriers in November. He left without appearing for the first team, and then had a brief stay with Kettering Town.

He signed for Southern League Premier Division club Aylesbury United in September 2005 and scored his first senior competitive goal for the club, a curled free kick to open the scoring in a 1–1 draw against Team Bath, on 1 October 2005. He played 20 games in all competitions before being released in February 2006. While studying for a BA degree in accounting and finance at the University of Northampton, Bewers played for the university football team, which qualified for the British Universities Sports Association Nationals Tournament in February 2006.

In March 2006, Bewers had a trial with Stamford, but signed for Cogenhoe United before the 2006–07 season. Bewers soon moved on to Rothwell Town, where he was appointed captain, and where he remained until he completed his degree course, graduating in 2008. After his spell with Rothwell was terminated, Bewers announced his retirement from the game due to injury. Despite this, he later moved on to Stamford before the 2008–09 season, before being promptly loaned out to Rothwell Corinthians.

Bewers left Stamford following his loan at Rothwell Corinthians and is now unattached. Bewers opted to retire from football. Following in his fathers footsteps he became an accountant. He now lives near his hometown with his wife and daughter.
