= Felippe Moraes =

Brazilian artist

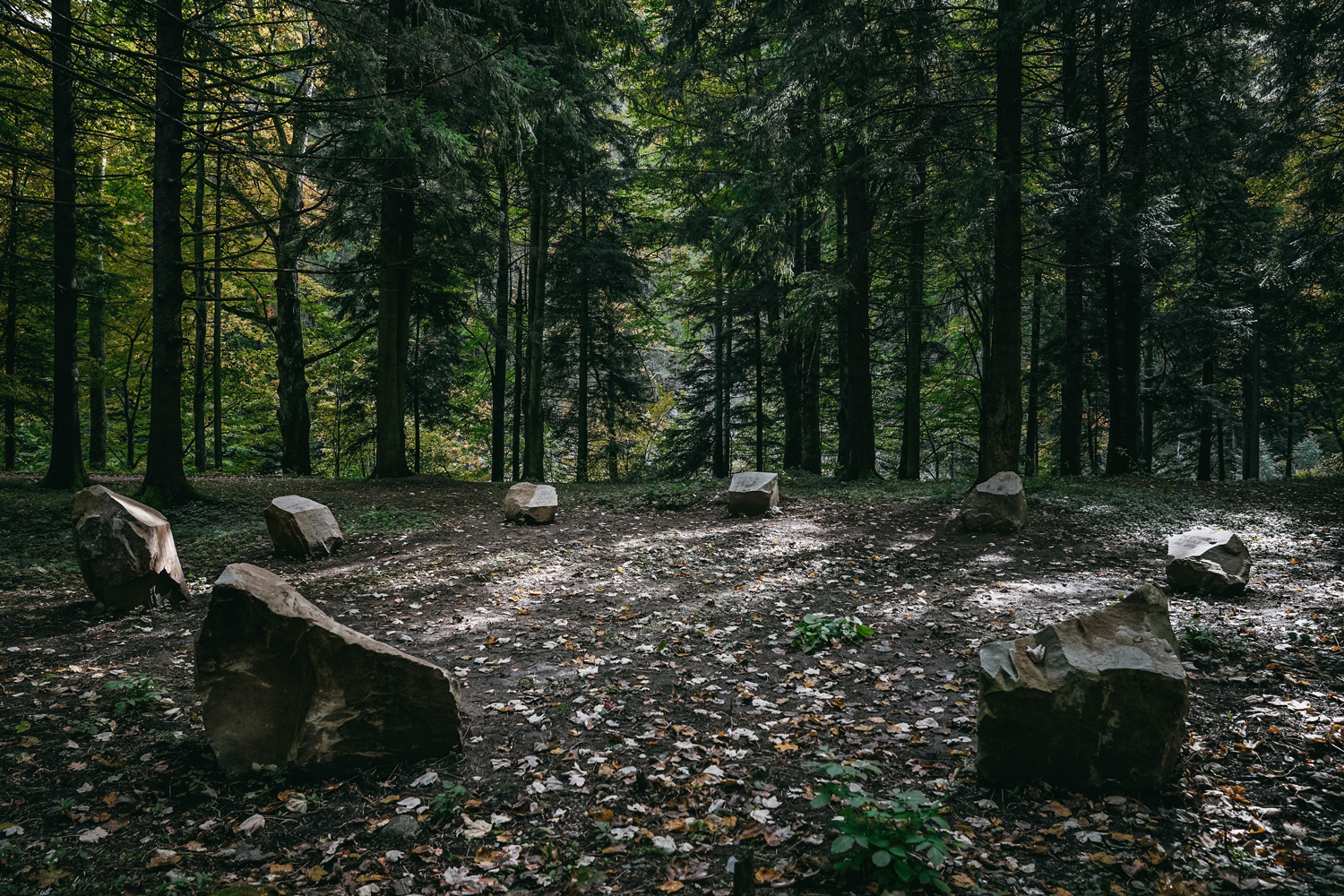
View of the work Monument to Euclid (2017) by Felippe Moraes installed at Slanic-Moldova, Romania.

Felippe Moraes (born July 9, 1988) is a visual artist, researcher and independent curator born in Rio de Janeiro, Brazil. Works with various medias such as sculpture, installation, drawing, painting and photography. His work is developed around revealing hidden patterns written within the universe, relating scientific methodology and spirituality. Currently is a PhD candidate in Contemporary Art at the College of The Arts at the University of Coimbra and holds an MA Fine Art from the University of Northampton.

== Work ==
In 2016 Felippe Moraes constructed his Monument to The Horizon (2016), a large-scale permanent public sculpture placed at Caminho Niemeyer in Niterói. The work is a five-meter tall steel tower around a small set of stairs that lead to a strip in the metal, revealing the horizon of Rio de Janeiro on the opposite side of the Guanabara Bay.

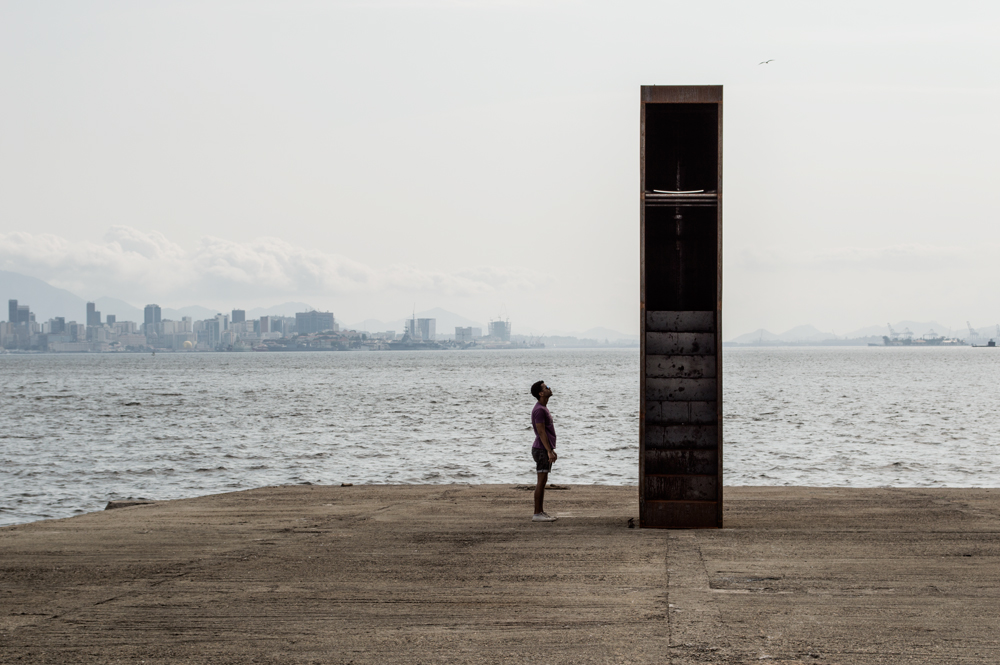
View of Monument to The Horizon (2016) by Felippe Moraes at Niterói, in the State of Rio de Janeiro, Brazil.

In 2017 was artist-in-residence in Tehran, Iran and in Slanic-Moldova, Romania, where he constructed his Monument to Euclid (2017), consisting of eight sandstones in a circle in the woods, and paying homage to the Greek mathematician Euclid. In 2020 he developed the series of photographs Eledá (2020), relating to his spiritual experiences with the orishas.
