= T. M. Devine =

Scottish historian

Sir Tom Devine OBE FRHistS FRSE FBA
- Born: 30 July 1945 (age 81); Motherwell, Lanarkshire, Scotland

Academic background
- Education: University of Strathclyde

Academic work
- Discipline: History
- Institutions: University of Strathclyde; University of Aberdeen; University of Edinburgh
- Doctoral students: Anne-Marie Kilday

Sir Thomas Martin Devine (born 30 July 1945) is a Scottish academic and author who specialises in the history of Scotland. He was knighted and made an Officer of the Order of the British Empire for his contributions to Scottish historiography, and is known for his overviews of modern Scottish history. He is an advocate of the total history approach to the history of Scotland. He is professor emeritus at the University of Edinburgh, and was formerly a professor at the University of Strathclyde and the University of Aberdeen.

== Life ==
=== Early and personal life ===
Thomas Martin Devine was born on 30 July 1945 in Motherwell in Lanarkshire, southern Scotland. His family is Scots-Irish from Irish Catholic roots. His four grandparents had migrated from British-ruled Ireland in 1890. His father benefited from what savings they accrued from working in the steel and coal industries, and went to university, going on to become a life-long schoolteacher. Tom Devine himself has five children.

He attended Our Lady's High School in Motherwell, where, he has recounted, he gave up history in his second year because the way that history was taught at the time was "endlessly boring", choosing geography instead.

Before his academic career commenced, Devine had several vacation jobs as variously a grave-digger, a Butlins Bluecoat (a clerical role, as opposed to a Butlins Redcoat) in the holiday camp at Filey, and an uncertified French language teacher in schools in Lanarkshire.

=== Academic career ===
Devine graduated from the University of Strathclyde in 1968 with First Class Honours in economic and social history. In 1969, a few months after commencing doctoral research, Devine was hired at the University of Strathclyde, where he was appointed assistant lecturer in history and eventually rose to head of the history department. In 1981 he and Christopher Smout were the founding editors of the periodical Scottish Economic and Social History, which was later to become the Journal of Scottish Historical Studies, Devine editing it until 1984.

He was appointed professor of Scottish history in 1988, and later became dean of the faculty of arts and social sciences, and then deputy principal of the university from 1994 to 1998. In 1991 Devine was awarded the degree of DLitt (Doctor of Letters) by the university in recognition of the quality of his published research to that date.

In 1998 he moved to the University of Aberdeen and became the founding director of the Research Institute of Irish and Scottish Studies (RIISS), later the UK Arts and Humanities Research Centre (AHRC) in I&SS. He was also appointed to the externally-funded Glucksman Professorship of Irish and Scottish Studies.

From 2006 to 2011 Devine was the Sir William Fraser Professor of Scottish History and Palaeography at the University of Edinburgh, retaining the title as Emeritus Professor afterwards. From 2008 he was also the first director there of the Scottish Centre for Diaspora Studies (now integrated into the Edinburgh Centre for Global History). He retired from Edinburgh in 2011 but returned by invitation of the Principal of the University for a further period as Senior Research Professor of History. His retirement celebration focused on a discussion of his career with former Prime Minister Gordon Brown in the University's McEwan Hall. Messages of congratulation were received from the Prime Minister of the UK and the First Minister of Scotland. In 2010, Devine participated in the Royal Society of Edinburgh's yearly symposium on the relationship between Scotland and slavery, where he delivered a plenary lecture.

Devine was listed #16 in 2014 in "Scotland's Power 100: The 100 most powerful people in Scotland" by The Herald, which described him as "the country's pre-eminent historian". He was ranked seventh most influential Catholic in Britain by The Tablet in 2015 which described him as "widely seen as the intellectual heavyweight behind Scottish nationalism".

=== Politics ===
Devine tried to avoid politics in his writing, stating in a 2010 interview with the Scottish Review of Books that he hoped that people could not tell his politics from his writings, in support of which he observed that the blogosphere had had him down as a Scottish Nationalist in the 1990s and yet as an obvious Unionist a decade later. He noted that he had often told people that "the future is not my period" when asked about current events, a statement that he had initially also made when asked about the 2014 Scottish independence referendum.

He was, however, later to take a public stance on the referendum, voting "Yes" for independence. He presented a public statement explaining his reasoning for this to reporters in a Glasgow restaurant on 15 August 2014, stating that he had himself never been a member of any political party, although members of his family, grandparents and parents, had supported the Labour Party. After giving his views on the Scottish Parliament, Scottish history and arts, the economy and education system of Scotland, and Irish Catholic Scots, he explained why he rejected "devolution max" as "just a sticking plaster" and came to the conclusion that he would be voting "Yes".

He has also spoken out on other political issues, such as objecting to the campaign to remove the statue of Henry Dundas (the Melville Monument) from St Andrew Square, Edinburgh, stating that it was based upon bad history, a simplistic view that gave Dundas sole responsibility for something where larger forces were in fact at play, an argument that brought him into conflict with Geoff Palmer. Another issue on which he has publicly commented was the removal of David Hume's name from a tower in George Square, Edinburgh. He has expressed the opinion that "[t]argetting statues is a largely meaningless gesture" that "does little to address the very real and ongoing issue of racial prejudice". Addressing a petition in 2020 to remove the names of the Tobacco Lords from streets in Glasgow, he stated that they should be retained "as a reminder of [our] past, warts and all" and that "Scotland and slavery should be embedded firmly in the school curriculum".

== Works ==
Devine is a leading proponent of Scottish-Irish historical studies, and has authored five monographs and edited over a dozen collections. He is a proponent of "total" history, which seeks to incorporate all aspects of history, from economic through social to cultural.

He has written on a wide range of subjects in 18th and 19th century Scottish history, from the colonial trade through agriculture to migration, with works dealing with both Highland and Lowland Scotland.

=== Early: The Tobacco Lords ===
Devine's 1975 book The Tobacco Lords about the Tobacco Lords originated in work that he had done for his doctoral thesis on the period after 1775. It followed in the footsteps of Jacob Myron Price and dealt with the "golden age" of the tobacco merchants of Glasgow, dealing with who the merchants were, their trading methods, what they did with their profits, and how the American Revolution affected them. Divided into four parts, the book addresses the investment of profits in part 1, trading methods in part 2, the period after the American Revolution in part 3, and the period after 1783 in part 4; and is structured as a set of questions and answers around specific points. In it, Devine propounded the traditional view about how a consumer goods industry in Glasgow arose in part in order to exchange for tobacco from Virginia and Maryland, and has detailed accounts of merchants like William Cunninghame and Company. James H. Soltow of Michigan State University observed that Devine's account contained "few surprises".

Professor of history Joseph Clarke Robert of the University of Richmond called it "an excellent book", providing just the one quibble that the map facing page 12 had Jamestown on south of the James River rather than in its correct position to the north. Jacob M. Price of the University of Michigan (and author of France and the Chesapeake) observed "a fair number of petty errors" in American geography (Fredericksburg and Falmouth being incorrectly located on the Potomac River and a non-existent "Berkshire County" in Maryland). Devine had only addressed America incidentally, focussing upon Scotland. Price also observed some confusion resulting from the same words meaning different things in English and Scottish business terminology.

Christopher Smout called it "a useful and thought-provoking volume" that "does not entirely satisfy" because it left unanswered questions about what happened to the tobacco trade and did not go into enough detail on an (in Smout's words) "important conclusion" that the American Revolution in fact did not fundamentally alter the tobacco trade, and that merchants in Glasgow largely picked up where they had left off after the war had finished. Devine had pointed out that the diversification into sugar processing, leather tanning, boot and shoe manufacturing, and the iron, glass and coal industries, extension to Caribbean and European markets, and involvement in banking and land investments all preceded the American Revolution, rather than followed it. William J. Hausman of the University of North Carolina agreed with Smout that in a "generally of high quality" book it was "disappointing and annoying" that although Devine had documented the pre-war investment pattern well, explanation of exactly how the Glasgow merchants reestablished their businesses remained "vague", Price concurring on the last point.

Devine was, in later life, to acknowledge the omission of the context of its entanglement with overseas slave-based economies as a blind spot in his early work on the Tobacco Lords.

=== 1980s: The Great Highland Famine ===
His 1988 The Great Highland Famine is an analysis of the impact of the late 1840s failure of the potato upon the Western Highlands of Scotland. It covers a longer period than its title might suggest, dealing with the 1840s and 1850s. Based upon in-depth research using a wide range of historical records from the government, charitable institutions, censuses, local parishes, and the great estates of the period, it both in places reinforced earlier conclusions that had been made upon less evidence and elsewhere refuted some (at the time) accepted ideas.

Devine divided the Highlands into east and west, and his conclusion about the western Highlands exemplified this. His conclusion that the western Highlands were at risk was not a novel one, but his further conclusion that there was no real famine mortality was characterised by L. M. Cullen of Trinity College Dublin as "quite surprising".

One of its revisions to (then) accepted ideas was to ascribe the population fall after the famine not to altered sex ratios, simply the fact that young men emigrated, but rather to a deliberate inhibition by Scottish estates on family formation without adequate land, in (in T. C. Smout's words) "an openly Malthusian way". Another point discussed in the book was the hidden involvement of Charles Trevelyan in various nominally private sector charitable famine relief projects.

David Dickson of Trinity College Dublin observed that this "remarkably comprehensive account" was possible because of the small size of the Scottish famine in comparison to the Irish one, with under 290,000 people in the Highlands of Scotland in 1841, which Ireland equalled with just the population of County Clare alone. Dickinson observed that to an Irish reader Devine, whilst not setting out to explicitly compare the two famines but having "made notable efforts to have an Irish angle", had provided "a fascinating combination of the familiar and the alien" showing both parallels and differences, although that Devine had not explored such differentiating factors as population density; and that Devine had indicated several ways in which future differential analyses of the Irish famine could be made, to note whether factors present in Devine's analysis of the Scottish famine could explain unevenness in the Irish one, that led to milder impacts in some counties such as County Donegal (an observation with which Cullen concurred).

=== 1990s: Edited collections at Strathclyde and Clanship to Crofters' War ===
The 1989 Improvement and Enlightenment, the 1990 Conflict and Stability in Scottish Society, the 1992 Scottish Emigration and Scottish Society, and the 1994 Scottish Elites are the proceedings of 1987, 1988, 1990, and 1991 seminars (respectively) at the University of Strathclyde, all edited by Devine. The first has a paper by Devine discussing changing landholdings in the 19th century in Higland Scotland, with an appendix of data. The second has a paper by Devine presenting Lowland Scotland as a society regulated by the landowning class with emigration as a release valve for the discontented, preventing civil unrest and violence. The third includes an introduction by Devine, discussing the paradoxical nature of Scottish emigration, why skilled urban residents emigrated despite the growing domestic demand for skilled labour during Scotland's industrialisation, and a paper by Devine highlighting the roles of landlords in the Highland emigrations since 1760 and of the 1840s and 1850s in particular. The fourth has a paper by Devine challenging the (then) accepted history of "lowland clearances".

The 1995 Glasgow, Volume I: Beginnings to 1830 is the first volume in what was a projected 3-volume work on the city, by primarily the staff of the University of Strathclyde and co-edited by Devine, who contributed the chapter on the tobacco trade and provided introduction and conclusion.

His 1995 Clanship to Crofters' War is a digest of his work to date on the Highlands updated by drawing on (then) recent work by Allan Macinness of the University of Aberdeen, Ewen Cameron, and others. Alaistair J. Durie of the University of Glasgow called it a "deeply informed and authoritative" survey of the history of the Highlands. Comprising 16 chapters in total, chronicling the economic and social history of the Highlands until the beginnings of the Crofters' War, it is a historical synthesis rather than a research-based text and is not footnoted as academic monographs are, containing just a few notes and a selection of further reading per chapter, and containing maps, contemporary photographs, and drawings. Historian Andrew MacKillop characterised this style as "consciously user-friendly" and called the work overall "an effective and cogent synthesis".

The book's key themes are the character, conduct, and changing composition of the landowning elite of the Highlands, including such things as the forced sale of clan lands held for centuries as a result of economic collapse following the Napoleonic Wars, which Durie noted to be "particularly strong" when it comes to analysis of who came to buy the land and why. MacKillop observed that Devine's synthesis of work to date served to highlight a deficiency in historical research into the economic transformation of the region, well studied in the North-West but understudied in the South-East.

The pivotal chapter, for Durie, was the one where Devine explained the late 18th century to early 19th century transformation of the Highlands from (in Durie's words) a "barren wilderness inhabited only by savages to a romantic landscape", in a process that Devine named "The Making of Highlandism". MacKillop considered that while it dealt with Highlandism as a reaction of Lowland Scotland to cultural pressures from England, it could have dealt more with the role of the elite of the Highlands, and their deliberate adoption of distinctive Highland symbols in order to compete for patronage in the military against the gentry of other parts of the Kingdom. Other chapters deal with the impacts of immigration, emigration, and Protestant evangelicalism, the decline of the Gaelic language, and with the experiences of urbanised Gaels.

=== Scottish Nation ===
In the view of Richard J. Finlay, Devine's (1999) Scottish Nation 1700–2000, whose publication coincided with the opening of the Scottish Parliament, is "the most comprehensive account of modern Scottish history". Brian Bonnyman, Honorary Fellow at the University of Edinburgh, called it "unsurpassed as a history of modern Scotland". William Walker Knox, history professor at the University of St Andrews, observed that a generalist approach in such a book "lays Devine open to attacks from specialists, who will no doubt find fault with his treatment of a particular event, period, or personality", and described the book as "surpass[ing] in knowledge and scope" M. Lynch's 1991 Scotland: A New History and T.C. Smout's 1986 A Century of the Scottish People, 1830–1950 and would be "the standard work on modern Scotland for the general reader and the undergraduate for some time ahead".

The book launch, held in the New Museum of Scotland included a telegram of congratulations from Gordon Brown, an introduction by Donald Dewar, and the attendance of most of Scotland's senior politicians. Finlay described the book as "the first major work that is unselfconsciously Scottish" about its subject, and also observed that it had the fortunate timing of being able to view the past from a post-Scottish Devolution viewpoint, a view not available to earlier historians such as Michael Lynch. He attributed the book's success to a "new mood of [Scottish] cultural confidence" and serendipitous timing.

Roger L. Emerson of the University of Western Ontario observed that Devine had "succeeded remarkably well" in his announced (in the book) purpose of "present[ing] a coherent account of the last 300 years of Scotland's past with the hope of developing a better understanding of the present" and incorporating the work of the most recent generation of Scottish historians. Being built on the work of Devine himself and others such as Smout and Michael Flynn, in conference papers and in articles in the aforementioned Scottish Economic and Social History, Emerson observed that the book "could not possibly have been written thirty years ago or even ten years ago".

Like The Great Highland Famine, the book is not footnoted in academic style, cites only books and not journal articles in its bibliography, and in Emerson's view was "clearly not designed as a textbook", since students will be unable to easily connect its various theses and data to their sources. It has five maps, which Emerson criticised for being "rather inadequate since the topography is only roughly indicated".

Finlay observed that as Scotland is a small nation, the "total" history approach is feasible for a work like Scottish Nation. The book furthermore approaches the problem of entanglement of Scottish history with British history by simply ignoring Britain, England, and the British Empire except where they are relevant to Scotland, which Finlay characterised as the same "standard historical technique of British history" when written from "an English metropolitan perspective". Emerson commented that in order to find political history of Acts of the United Kingdom Parliament concerning Scotland one would still benefit from consulting William Ferguson's Scotland 1689 to the Present (Note: Ferguson 1968 in further reading) in addition to Devine's book.

Drawing upon his own extensive research, something that not many other authors of histories for the popular market were able to do, in the book Devine presented Scottish history of the late 18th and 19th centuries as far more revolutionary in nature than the history of England in the same period — in fact faster, in its speed of urbanisation, than anywhere else in Europe. He painted a picture of Scotland as well positioned, from roots in its mercantile and military practices from the 15th century, to take advantage, with the formation of the Kingdom of Great Britain, of what was then the largest free trade zone in all of Europe, and the British Empire that was to follow.

The book also incorporated areas of Scottish historiography that had theretofore been under-represented or neglected; including a chapter on "Scottish Women: Family, Work, and Politics", discussion of the "silent revolution" of the rural Lowlands, a chapter on the "New Scots" who immigrated from Ireland, Lithuania, Italy, and other countries including ethnic Jewish and Asian groups, and a chapter on "Emigrants" dealing with Scotland's high emigration rates during the period.

Devine soundly rejected the thesis that there had been a "crisis in Scottish nationhood" in the second half of the 19th century, as the result of assimilation, Anglicisation, and cultural collapse. Instead he argued that the lack of a strong political nationalist movement did not prevent "a strong and coherent sense of identity to exist within the [U]nion and provide a solid foundation for cultural achievement". Bonnyman observed that this is, however, a seeming contradiction with his chapter on "Highlandism and Scottish Identity", which posits the very sense of cultural disintegration and loss of identity — Scottish society "searching for an identity amid unprecedented economic and social change and under threat of cultural conquest by a much more powerful neighbour" — that he had dismissed in an earlier chapter.

Devine's treatment of cultural history, as opposed to economic history, tended towards a simpler synopsis of established work on the subject. Emerson observed that it was somewhat lacking in both political and intellectual history, with little on the Glasgow Boys, Hugh MacDiarmid and contemporaries, and Charles Rennie Mackintosh and associates. Knox observed that cultural history was weaker in the book, with youth culture seemingly ended with Elvis Presley, women's political activity becoming (in Knox's words) "no more than a footnote in a political narrative dominated by male concerns and interests" following the Glasgow Women's Housing Association and the rent strikes of 1915, and Asian immigrants referred to as "coloured". Knox ascribed this in part to a more general weakness in the book's coverage of the period after the Second World War, which he suggested was not necessarily solely because of Devine's focus on the period from the late 18th century to the advent of the First World War, the core of the book, but also simply because of there being less historical scholarship to work from for that period. The book's chapter on education passes over such things as debates over the curriculum and privatisation in the 1980s and 1990s, tailing off with things like the introduction of comprehensive schools in the 1960s; and its chapter on religion does not address things like the decline in church attendance from the 1960s onwards. Furthermore, whilst the cultural topics of education, immigration, religion, and women get their own chapters, other topics such as leisure and work do not.

In Knox's view the chapter on women is incomplete, solely addressing the beginnings of the women's movements as suffrage issues and ignoring their origins in temperance movements and anti-slavery campaigns, not addressing late 20th century campaigns for greater numbers of women politicians, not addressing unionisation and the "family wage", and not addressing darker aspects of female cultural history such as wife beating, for which Knox observed "extensive documentation exists", and the sometimes dark, drunken, and violent cultural landscapes of female life presented by things such William M. Walker's Juteopolis. (Note: Walker 1979 in further reading)

Knox also pointed out that Devine's historical narrative of a long term trend in Scottish nationalism ignored the complexities of the Scottish Labour Party with its internal problems after the end of World War Two. He ameliorated these criticisms by suggesting that a "more analytical, rigorous, and thematic survey of Scottish history that the historical profession" — as opposed to a popular readership — "might prefer is now beyond the capacity of a single author, however gifted".

A revised edition in 2006 added three more chapters on post-Devolution topics, including politics.

=== 21st century: Unplanned Trilogy and The Scottish Clearances ===
In 2012 Devine's publisher Penguin Books retrospectively started marketing Scottish Nation along with his later Scotland's Empire and The Ends of the Earth as Devine's Scottish Trilogy. Devine had not planned it this way.

Scotland's Empire, 1600–1815 (2003) was roughly contemporary with Michael Fry's 2001 The Scottish Empire and Niall Ferguson's 2003 Empire: How Britain Changed the World. It occasioned a public spat between Devine and Fry, each negatively reviewing the other's book in the press. At 476 pages, 100 pages of which are footnotes and bibliography, it covers some of the same grounds as earlier works, including the chapter 4 "Trade and Profit" (first appearing in the aforementioned Glasgow and covering the same ground as The Tobacco Lords) and chapter 6 covering the marketisation of the Highland economy in much the same way as Devine covered it in Scottish Nation. The book is not as much about the influence of the Scots over the British Empire, as it is about the influence of the British Empire on Scotland, and draws occasional parallels between the north-west Highlands of the 19th century and the history of the West of Ireland.

Christopher Harvie noted that its coverage of "Colonizing India" fails to mention the reforms of Cornwallis in India.

To The Ends of the Earth: Scotland's Global Disapora (2011) was aimed at the popular history market, in thirteen chapters with accompanying pictures and photographs. The book deals with Scottish trade with all parts of the planet, from the Hong Kong firm of Jardine, Matheson, and Company through markets in Latin and South America to the United States and the Middle East. The book is structured such that each chapter is in the form of setting up an initial question about a particular aspect of the Diaspora, which is then answered with an overview of the (then) current state of historical research in the area.

In the opinion of Geoffrey Plank of the University of East Anglia the most contentious chapter of the book discussed the relationship between slavery and the Industrial Revolution in Scotland, asserting that overseas connections formed in the era of slavery were an important factor in Scottish trade for long after slavery itself was abolished, and pointing out the intangible costs of Scotland's economic development. Kyle Hughes of the University of Ulster called it "the book's most thought-provoking chapter" for pointing out that whilst the actual slave trade itself was higher in English ports like Liverpool and Bristol than it was in Scottish ports, the economy of Scotland, in its textile industry and otherwise, was more clearly and directly fuelled by the products of the slave-based economies overseas.

Plank characterised the book as a collection of freestanding essays more than a continuous narrative, and that several themes explored in early chapters were not continued in later ones. Plank gave the example of slavery and racism, discussed early in the book, and then entirely omitted from a later chapter that deals with Scottish influences on the American Civil War despite how Scottish symbols of clanship and burning crosses were warped into (in Plank's words) "a thoroughly racist" subculture. Devine discussed some of the influences of Ulster Scots on the South of the United States, including how the obsessions of Scottish descendants in other countries with the likes of tartans, clans, and other Scottish symbols can seem "risible" or "offensive" to people in Scotland.

Overall, Plank considered the book to be insufficient, as the subjects like Scottish participation in wars against the native peoples of Australia and North America, the fur trade, and the métis are complex moral issues where people and processes are not absolutely good nor bad. Hughes pointed out that it omitted the "near disapora" of the approximately 670,000 Scots who simply migrated to other parts of the Kingdom between 1841 and 1921. Angela McCarthy considered the account unbalanced, with its concentration on some of the ruthless actions of people in the Scottish Diaspora in need of a counterpoint with the more positive aspects, and covering recent studies of the Diaspora in New Zealand. She praised it for giving more than a mere nod to the relationship between the Diaspora and people in Scotland as many other such histories do, and for its exposition of the several qualitative differences between the migrations of Scots and Catholic Irish.

The Scottish Clearances: A History of the Dispossessed 1600–1900 (2018), as the use of the word "Scottish" in its title was intended to indicate, addresses not only the Highland Clearances, well known in Scottish history from the middle 20th century onwards because of the works of John Prebble but also (in the view of academic historians) somewhat distorted by the same, but also the less well known (outside of academic circles, before the publication of Devine's book) Lowland Clearances. Devine had already visited the subject in his 2006 Clearance and Improvement: Land, Power and People in Scotland 1700–1900, but in the opinion of Brian Morton that "excellent and thoughtful" book in light of Devine's later book "now looks like a preliminary skirmish", with Devine having pushed back the start of the account by a full century.

Devine dedicated the book to Malcolm Gray, author of The Highland Economy 1750–1850. He structured it into three parts, the first an introduction (in which Devine emphasises that pre-Clearance rural Scotland was not a romanticised primitive static culture), the second part examining the Lowland Clearances, and the third part addressing the Highland ones.

Ewen A. Cameron, Devine's successor as the Sir William Fraser Professor of Scottish History and Palaeography, described Devine as having "la[id] out this history with admirable lucidity" in "a comprehensive account". In both Morton's and Cameron's views, Devine introduced one (in Cameron's words) "very important point" that Prebble lacked, an account of the people who were dispossessed, and their resistance to the clearances.

Devine's book also challenged the theretofore established popular view that the sole cause of the Clearances was landlordism, ascribing it instead to many causes: the majority of Scottish emigrants to the Americas being from the Lowlands rather than from the Highlands, who emigrated in search of better prospects than they had in Scotland; bankruptcies of land-owners and a new more absentee land-owning class that lived beyond their means; a rising population in areas of subsistence agriculture; decreases in available arable land thanks to increased sheep farming; insufficient responses to the potato famine; increased enforcement by authorities on the untaxed distillation of whisky; racist ideas about Celts and Gaels; and victim-blaming by the Church of Scotland telling people that their present circumstances in life were punishment for their own sins. In the book Devine also pointed out that landlords were not wholly callous and wicked with no redeeming features, as they had been painted, with some worried about their duties as feudal chiefs, others generous in both investing in job creation and funding relief efforts, and even the infamous Countess of Sutherland creating a new village on the coast for her tenants.

To reviewer Alan Taylor of the Scottish Review of Books, Devine had told a story where the Industrial Revolution had been "infinitely more effective in clearing land than ever the likes of Patrick Sellar managed".

In answering his own question in the closing chapter of the book, Devine ascribed the more widespread identification of loss of land in Scotland with only the Highland Clearances to the fact that they, in contrast to the Lowland ones, took place in an age of steam railways, the telegraph, and 19th century Christian movements for drawing attention to the plight of the poor.

=== Other works ===
- Scotland and Ireland, 1600 to 1850 (joint editor and contributor, John Donald, 1983)
- The Transformation of Rural Scotland: Social Change and the Agrarian Economy, 1660–1815 (Edinburgh University Press, 1994, reprinted 1998)
- Exploring the Scottish Past (John Donald, 1995)
- Independence or Union: Scotland's Past and Scotland's Present (Allen Lane, The Penguin Press, 2016)
- Tea and Empire: James Taylor in Victorian Ceylon (joint author, Manchester University Press, 2017)

== Awards and honours ==
Devine was awarded the Senior Hume Brown Prize for the Best First Book in Scottish history (1976); the Saltire Society Prize for Best Book on Scottish History (1988–1991); and the Royal Society of Edinburgh Henry Duncan Prize and Lectureship in Scottish Studies (1993).

He was elected a Fellow of the Royal Society of Edinburgh (RSE) in 1992, of the British Academy in 1994, an Honorary Member of the Royal Irish Academy in 2001, and to the Academy of Europe in 2021. He is also a Fellow of the Royal Historical Society.

Devine was awarded the RSE's Royal Medal in 2001, the RSE's inaugural Sir Walter Scott Prize in 2012, the American-Scottish Foundation's Wallace Award in 2016, the Lifetime Achievement Award of the UK all-party parliamentary group on Archives and History of the House of Commons and House of Lords in July 2018, and Honorary Membership of Scottish PEN in 2020.

He was made an Officer of the Order of the British Empire (OBE) in the 2005 New Year Honours for services to Scottish history, and was knighted in the 2014 Birthday Honours for "services to the study of Scottish history".
