= Ty Stiklorius =

American music executive

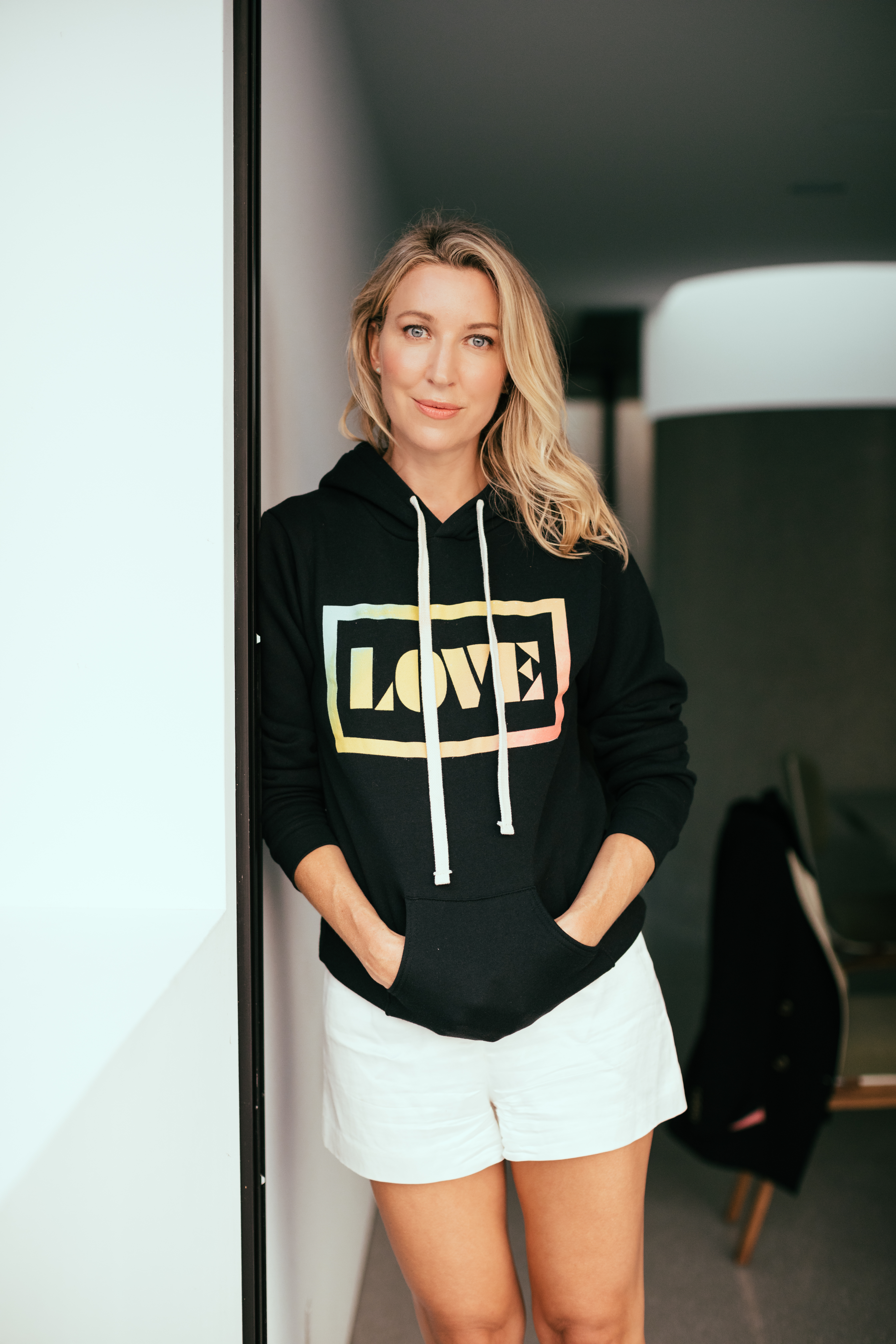
- Born: Thaïs Stiklorius; February 25, 1975 (age 51); Philadelphia, Pennsylvania, U.S.
- Education: University of Pennsylvania (BA); Wharton School of Business (MBA)
- Occupation: Businesswoman
- Years active: 2006–present
- Website: friendsatwork.com

Ty Stiklorius (born Thaïs Stiklorius; February 25, 1975) is an American music executive and film and television producer. She is the founder and CEO of Friends at Work, a management company headquartered in Los Angeles.

== Early life ==
Stiklorius was born in Philadelphia, Pennsylvania to Jon and Candace (née Pfeffer) Stiklorius. She grew up in Philadelphia where she attended Friends' Central School, a Quaker friends school based in the Main Line. Stiklorius earned a bachelor's degree from the University of Pennsylvania in 1997. She subsequently attended the Wharton School of Business where she earned a Masters of Business Administration in 2003.

== Career ==
Prior to attending the Wharton School of Business, Stiklorius worked at a music tech company called G-Vox. She also worked at Monsoon Microstudios, a multi-media creative agency based in Philadelphia.

After receiving an MBA, Stiklorius worked in Los Angeles under Kevin Mayer at the global strategy consulting firm, L.E.K. Consulting. After L.E.K., Stiklorius worked as the Director of Business Development under Sarah Harden and Tom Fuelling at Ascent Media.

In January 2009, Stiklorius became a partner at The Artists Organization (TAO), a talent management company with offices in New York, Santa Monica, and Nashville. She brought John Legend to TAO and managed his career while there.

In October 2012, Stiklorius became co-president with J. Irving at Troy Carter's Atom Factory, an entertainment and management company.

=== Friends at Work ===
Stiklorius founded a music management company, Friends at Work (FAW), in 2015 and remains its CEO.

In October 2024, Ty Stiklorius wrote an op-ed in The New York Times calling for reforms within the music industry. She recounted a distressing experience from 27 years prior at a New Year's Eve party hosted by Sean "Diddy" Combs, where an unknown man directed her into a bedroom, leading to a terrifying situation. Drawing on her experience as a talent manager and CEO of Friends at Work, she discussed issues such as transparency, artist compensation, and ethical standards in management. Stiklorius emphasized the need for structural changes to ensure fair treatment and support for artists, advocating for greater accountability across the industry.

=== JL Ventures and Get Lifted Film Co. ===
In 2006, John Legend and Stiklorius founded JL Ventures. Shortly after the inception of JL Ventures, Stiklorius became Legend's full time manager.

In 2012, the Get Lifted Film Co. production company was founded. Ty is a principal alongside John Legend at the company.

== Credits ==
=== Filmography ===
Year	Title	Notes
2015	Southern Rites (Documentary)	Co-Executive Producer
2015	Can You Dig This (Documentary)	Executive Producer
2015	Breaking Through (Film)	Executive Producer
2015–2016	Sing It On (TV Series)	Executive Producer; 16 episodes
2016	La La Land (Film)	Executive Producer
2016–2017	Underground (TV Series)	Executive Producer; 20 episodes
2018	Monster (Film)	Executive Producer
2018	Jesus Christ Superstar Live in Concert (TV Movie)	Executive Producer
2018	United Skates (Documentary)	Executive Producer
2018	Ashe '68 (Short)	Executive Producer
2018	Crow: The Legend (Short)	Executive Producer
2018	A Legendary Christmas with John and Chrissy (TV Special)	Executive Producer
2019	Sherman's Showcase (TV Series)	Executive Producer; 8 episodes
2019	Rhythm + Flow (TV Series)	Executive Producer; 10 episodes
2019	Giving Voice (Documentary)	Executive Producer
2020	Atlanta's Missing and Murdered: The Lost Children (TV Mini Series)	Executive Producer; 5 episodes
2020	John Legend and Family: Bigger Love Father's Day (TV Special)	Executive Producer
2020	40 Years a Prisoner (Documentary)	Executive Producer
2020	With Drawn Arms (Documentary)	Executive Producer
2020	A Crime on the Bayou (Documentary)	Executive Producer
2020	Jingle Jangle: A Christmas Journey (Film)	Executive Producer
2021	Philly D.A. (TV Series Documentary)	Special Thanks
2021	The Black Church: This Is Our Story, This Is Our Song (TV Series Documentary)	Executive Producer; 2 episodes
2021	The Legend of the Underground (Documentary)	Executive Producer
2021	Citizen Ashe (Documentary)	Executive Producer
