= Underground (TV series) =

- Genre: Period drama
- Created by: Misha Green; Joe Pokaski
- Starring: Jurnee Smollett-Bell; Aldis Hodge; Jessica De Gouw; Alano Miller; Christopher Meloni; Amirah Vann
- Theme music composer: Angelique Cinelu and Curtis Richardson
- Opening theme: Heaven's Door by Alice Smith
- Composers: Laura Karpman; Raphael Saadiq
- Country of origin: United States
- Original language: English
- No. of seasons: 2
- No. of episodes: 20

Production
- Executive producers: John Legend; Mike Jackson; Ty Stiklorius; Akiva Goldsman; Tory Tunnell; Joby Harrold
- Producer: W. Mark McNair
- Production locations: Baton Rouge, Louisiana Savannah, Georgia
- Cinematography: Evans Brown; Hernan Otaño; Kevin McKnight
- Production companies: Afemme; Hemming Taylor (season 1 only); Get Lifted Film Company; Weed Road Pictures; Safehouse Pictures; Wandering Rocks Productions; Tribune Studios; Sony Pictures Television

Original release
- Network: WGN America
- Release: March 9, 2016 – May 10, 2017

Underground is an American period drama television series created by Misha Green and Joe Pokaski about the Underground Railroad in Antebellum Georgia. The show debuted March 9, 2016, on WGN America. On April 25, 2016, WGN renewed the show for a 10-episode second season, that premiered on March 8, 2017. On May 30, 2017, it was announced that WGN had cancelled the show after two seasons. The cancellation came after the network's parent company Tribune Media was attempting to be purchased by conservative corporation Sinclair Broadcasting Group, which led to speculation that the latter did not approve of the subject matter of the show.

The Oprah Winfrey Network acquired rebroadcast rights for Underground in 2020.

== Cast ==
=== Main ===
- Aldis Hodge as Noah, a driven, perceptive, and restless slave on the Macon plantation. He is one of the Macon 7.
- Jurnee Smollett-Bell as Rosalee, a young, shy, and sheltered house slave on the Macon plantation. She is one of the Macon 7.
- Jessica De Gouw as Elizabeth Hawkes, a socialite with abolitionist ideals.
- Alano Miller as Cato, a cunning and charismatic slave. He is one of the Macon 7.
- Christopher Meloni as August Pullman, a secretive bounty hunter who walks a tightrope between morality and survival.
- Amirah Vann as Ernestine, the head house slave of the Macon plantation, who is fiercely protective of her children. She also uses her sexual relationship with Tom Macon to leverage protection for her children. He is the father of her two children, Rosalee and James. (recurring season 1, main cast season 2)

=== Recurring ===
- Christopher Backus as Jeremiah Johnson, an ex-con and slave catcher. (season 1)
- Marc Blucas as John Hawkes, an abolitionist lawyer.
- Reed Diamond as Tom Macon (ne Hawkes), John Hawkes' brother and the owner of the Macon plantation. (season 1)
- James Lafferty as Kyle Risdin, a US Marshall and Elizabeth's ex-fiancé. (season 1)
- Renwick Scott as Henry, a teenaged slave with a rebellious streak and a heart of gold. He is one of the Macon 7. (season 1)
- Chris Chalk as William Still.
- Adina Porter as Pearly Mae, a strong-willed wife, mother, and slave who first gives voice to the song in which the runners will find clues to help guide them to freedom. Pearly Mae is literate and reads the Bible to her husband Moses, which makes the other slaves believe he is the one who can read, although it is only Pearly Mae who can read.
- Mykelti Williamson as Moses, a fiery preacher for the Macon plantation's field slaves. Many of the slaves believe that he can read the Bible; however, Moses is illiterate. It is his wife Pearly Mae who secretly reads for him. He is one of the Macon 7. (season 1)
- Theodus Crane as Zeke, a formidable slave in both strength and stature. He is one of the Macon 7. (season 1)
- Andrea Frankle as Suzanna Macon, Tom Macon's wife and Pearly Mae's half-sister, who frequently expresses her disdain for Ernestine, her husband's mistress and mother of two of his slave children.
- Toby Nichols as Thomas Roberts "T.R." Macon, Tom and Suzanna's son.
- Mary Katherine Duhon as Mary Macon, Tom and Suzanna's teenage daughter. (season 1)
- Kedrick Brown as Lou, Warrior Prisoner helping Noah to escape. (season 2)
- Johnny Ray Gill as Sam, a talented carpenter and Rosalee and James's older half-brother.
- PJ Marshall as Bill Meekes, the Macon plantation overseer.
- Darielle Stewart as Boo, Moses and Pearly Mae's daughter. Although she is quiet and shy, she is one of the Macon 7. (season 1)
- Maceo Smedley as James, Ernestine's youngest child. He is the younger brother of Sam and Rosalee.
- Michelle Elaine as Corra, a house slave on the Macon Plantation.
- Jannette Sepwa as Sarah, a house slave on the Macon Plantation.
- Brady Permenter as Ben Pullman, August's son. (season 1)
- Clarke Peters as Jay, August's slave. (season 1)
- Jennifer Nettles as Charlotte, August's wife and Ben's mother. (season 1)
- Devyn A. Tyler as Seraphina, Zeke's wife. (season 1)
- Joseph Sikora as Frog Jack, a trader who cares about nothing but money.
- David Born as Jim McNulty, leader of a small group of slave catchers (season 1)
- Wayne Pere as Reverend Willowset, a southern reverend whose support Tom attempts to gain. (season 1)
- David Kency as Clyde, a former slave who helps others escape on the Underground Railroad. (season 1)
- William Mark McCullough as Theo, who helps the Macon 7 escape along the Underground Railroad. (season 1)
- Sadie Stratton as Patty Cannon, an illegal slave trader who kidnapped free blacks and fugitive slaves to sell into slavery in the South.
- Michael Trotter as Elden Donohue, a biographer who plans to write Patty Cannon's life story. (season 2)
- Jesse Luken as Smoke, a slave catcher in Patty Cannon's gang. (season 2)
- Cullen Moss as Jack, a less competent slave catcher in Patty Cannon's gang. (season 2)
- Keith Arthur Bolden as Table Tapper, a preaching slave on the Rowe Plantation. (season 2)
- Tyler Barnhardt as Matthew Roe, master of the Rowe Plantation. (season 2)
- Marcus Hester as Gore, the overseer at the Rowe Plantation. (season 2)
- Aisha Hinds as Harriet Tubman (season 2)
- Bokeem Woodbine as Daniel, a slave who teaches himself to read. (season 2)
- Indigo as Bette, Daniel's wife. (season 2)
- Bailey Tippen as Toosie, Daniel and Bette's daughter. (season 2)
- Neko Parham as Valentine, a runaway who is injured trying to escape. (season 2)
- Robert Crayton as Elijah a runaway slave trying to escape.
- Jasika Nicole as Georgia Goodman, an abolitionist who becomes friends with Elizabeth. (season 2)
- Lane Miller as Lucas, an abolitionist in Georgia's group. (season 2)
- Dawntavia Bullard as Emily, an abolitionist in Georgia's group. (season 2)
- Rayan Lawrence as Elliot, an abolitionist in Georgia's group. (season 2)
- Robert Walker-Branchaud as Thad, an abolitionist in Georgia's group. (season 2)
- Rana Roy as Devi, Cato's lover. (season 2)
- Alex Collins as Francis, Cato's manservant. (season 2)
- DeWanda Wise as Clara, an ambitious, vengeful slave on the Rowe Plantation. (season 2)
- Robert Christopher Riley as Hicks, Ernestine's lover on the Rowe Plantation. (season 2)
- Jordane Christie as French, Ernestine's deceased husband, Sam's father (season 2)
- John Legend as Frederick Douglass (season 2, Legend is also an executive producer on the show)
- Candice Glover as Gullah Woman #1 (season 2)
- Angela Bassett as Midwife

== Production ==
On February 27, 2015, WGN America gave a 10-episode straight-to-series order for the series which is created by Misha Green and Joe Pokaski. Season one was filmed in Baton Rouge, Louisiana. Season two was filmed in Savannah, Georgia.

== Broadcast ==
In Canada, the show was broadcast on Bravo. Season one was made available on the Australian streaming platform, Stan, in January 2017. In the United Kingdom, the show was broadcast on Sky1.

== Episodes ==
=== Series overview ===
Season	Episodes	Originally aired	
Season	Episodes	First aired	Last aired
1	10	March 9, 2016	May 11, 2016
2	10	March 8, 2017	May 10, 2017

=== Season 1 (2016) ===
No. overall	No. in season	Title	Directed by	Written by	Original release date	U.S. viewers (millions)
1	1	"The Macon 7"	Anthony Hemingway	Misha Green & Joe Pokaski	March 9, 2016	1.421
In 1857, a slave named Noah is captured while running through a forest. He is placed in a cabin with other captured runaways, where he finds a dying slave has carved a song containing a map to freedom into the wall. He imprints the song in blood on to a piece of his shirt before being taken back to the Macon Plantation, where he convinces Tom Macon that he was not trying to escape, but merely got lost on his way to another plantation. A house slave, Rosalee, helps her mother, Ernestine, deliver a baby to two of the field slaves, only for the baby's mother to drown it to protect it from the world. Rosalie struggles with the mother's reasoning, and Ernestine tells her she does not know what it is like to want to protect her children from the world. When Rosalee tends to Noah's injuries from his escape and subsequent whipping, she realizes he is hiding something. Later, after her very young brother, James, and Tom's young son cause an accident with the overseer, Rosalee takes the blame to protect James. Noah tells his friend Henry that he has plans for both of them to run, but they cannot do it alone, and they consider bringing others with them while being observed by Cato, a slave driver with a burnt face working under the overseer. Meanwhile, in Washington, lawyer and activist John Hawkes attempts to draw attention to the injustices of slavery, but no one except abolitionist William Still listens. Mr. Still attempts to recruit John to actively help the cause by harboring fugitives in his home near the Ohio River. He tells his wife Elizabeth, who believes the cause is just, but is afraid to risk it all while they are trying to have children. That night, at a party to celebrate the birthday of Tom's daughter, Tom Macon and John Hawkes are revealed to be brothers, and Tom asks John to manage his campaign for senator. Elizabeth witnesses the cruelty of slavery firsthand, as well as the indifference of the Southern women. That same night, at the funeral for the drowned baby, Noah speaks to the other slaves he considered bringing: Moses, a preacher who Noah believes can read; Sam, a carpenter and Rosalee and James' half brother; and Zeke, a large muscular slave and the baby's father. Zeke agrees, Sam refuses, and Moses considers it, taking the song to his shack, where he asks his wife Pearly Mae, the one who's actually literate, to read it to him. Rosalee later arrives, and after speaking with Noah, also considers running. Cato, having realized Noah is planning something, threatens to reveal his plan to Tom if Noah does not include him. Elizabeth and John talk about their belief in freedom, and about how she does not want to bring a child into a world of slavery, and they decide to join the cause. Meanwhile, August Pullman, a man struggling to pay for his wife's treatment at a mental institution, finds a runaway slave and helps her hide from catchers, only to later turn her in himself.
2	2	"War Chest"	Anthony Hemingway	Misha Green & Joe Pokaski	March 16, 2016	0.989
Noah and the group discuss how to escape the plantation, accounting for various problems, while Cato continues to harass them and keep his intentions unclear. Sam agrees to build something enabling them to get under the bridge, Pearly Mae forges freedom papers and learns that Moses plans to bring her and Boo along, and Noah and Henry plan to steal a gun from a neighboring plantation during a dance that night. Other men arrive at the plantation to consider funding Tom Macon's campaign. After hearing some of the other house slaves talking about the dance, Rosalee wonders what freedom will be like, and Ernestine subtly urges her not to run, claiming their life is the easiest they can achieve. Later, one of the guests makes sexual advances toward her, but she is saved by her mother, who later has sex with Tom after making him promise James will not work in the fields. After Cato nearly gets Noah caught, Noah tells him about the plan to steal the gun. That night, a group of slaves, including Noah, Cato and Rosalee go to the dance, where Noah tells Cato to steal the gun while Noah has sex with the mistress of the plantation. This is shown to be a lie when the mistress decides to have sex with Cato, allowing Noah to steal the gun. When Cato tries to retaliate, Noah threatens him with the gun. Later, Rosalee and Noah dance, and he asks her to join him when he runs. Meanwhile, John and Elizabeth meet William Still to join the cause, only to find a runaway has been brought to him, and slave catchers are looking for him. They are trapped, but eventually manage to trick the slave catchers into assaulting them, causing the sheriff to arrest them. A wolf kills August's chickens, and he and Ben track the wolf, eventually killing it. When August finds bare footprints leading away from the wolf's body, he follows them, eventually catching a runaway slave and killing him, which is witnessed by Ben.
3	3	"The Lord's Day"	Anthony Hemingway	Misha Green & Joe Pokaski	March 23, 2016	0.895
On Sunday, Noah and Henry decide the escape will happen next Saturday night after headcount, as there is no work on Sundays. When Seraphina is sold to another plantation, Zeke attacks the men escorting her away, breaks their wagon, and is sent to the box. Sam devises a way under the bridge, which Noah tests, nearly being caught by Tom Macon. Realizing their falsified papers mean nothing unless stamped with the Macon seal, Noah has Sam enlist Rosalee to steal the seal from Tom's office. Despite having doubts about running, she does, but is unable to return it before Tom notices it is missing. Cato has Zeke released from the box, convincing him that Noah was going to abandon him. Tom forces the slaves to stand in lines and hold railroad beams, telling them they will all be punished if they all fall before the thief steps forward. Ernestine realizes Rosalee is the thief, and has T.R. Macon, Tom's son, pretend he stole the seal. Rosalee admits to Sam she is too scared to run, and decides to tell Noah. While looking for him, she is harassed by the drunk overseer. Noah finds her, and she tells him they have to run, as the overseer is dead, resulting in them sneaking out in the repaired wagon. Meanwhile, John and Elizabeth encounter Elizabeth's former fiancé, Kyle Risdin, now a U.S. Marshal, who reminds them of the governor's ball that night. After meeting other members of the Underground Railroad, who outfit their house with ways to hide runaways, they attend the ball, where Elizabeth distracts the guests while John takes new information on boat patrols and new marshals from the governors office, which he later gives to other members of the cause. Later, a runaway comes to them seeking help, only to attack John, believing the lawyer sold his wife into slavery.
4	4	"Firefly"	Anthony Hemingway	Misha Green & Joe Pokaski	March 30, 2016	0.915
The overseer is tended by Cato and Ernestine, and manages to tell Tom Macon that Rosalee stabbed him. Believing he will die, Macon promotes Cato to overseer, and he exercises his authority over the others, who distrust him. Sam tells Ernestine about the escape attempt when pressured. Later, she hears from Mrs. Macon about a train leaving north that day. Noah and Rosalee stop at another cabin to rest and get fresh clothes, and share a quiet moment. Later, while fleeing through the swamp, Rosalee proves her worth by poisoning the dogs sent after them. August and Ben arrive at the plantation, and Macon agrees to hire August if the runaways are not brought back by nightfall. Noah and Rosalee find shelter, and kiss, before Noah decides to go back for the team. Ernestine tells Cato about the train, knowing about his ambition. Cato later brings the entire escape team to be punished, and reveals he burned his own face to hide marks that he attempted escape, before burning the cotton field to create a distraction for them to run. However, August realizes the burning is a distraction, and catches the runners at the bridge. Pearly Mae blocks him, allowing the others to escape. Henry is nearly captured by a slave catcher, who is shot and killed by a returning Noah, who leads the team to Rosalee. When they regroup, she realizes Pearly Mae and Sam are missing. Sam is shown to not have run, instead helping put out the fire. Meanwhile, John and Elizabeth are held captive by two slaves who came seeking help, and eventually the man who accused him of selling his wife forces Elizabeth to whip John, at which point he tells them about the wife he helped sell into slavery. The man realizes he is lying, and tries to kill them, but they are saved by Kyle Risdin. John reveals part of his story was true, and they decide to continue their work as abolitionists.
5	5	"Run & Gun"	Romeo Tirone	Misha Green & Joe Pokaski	April 6, 2016	0.978
Off the plantation, Noah, Zeke, Cato, Henry, Moses, Boo and Rosalee race to catch the train headed north, pursued by August and Tom Macon's men. Noah, Cato and Moses try to get information from Frog Jack, a man who cares about nothing but money, in exchange for their revolver, but are found quickly by August. In the ensuing fight, Moses is shot in the arm, and the others find out he cannot read. After Zeke beats Frog Jack and the catchers attack August, they escape, Cato taking the revolver. The group splits up to divert the slave catchers from Moses, Boo and Rosalee. The catchers pursue Cato and Zeke to a river. Zeke suggests fighting them together, but Cato shoots him in the knee and escapes. The catchers attack him, and shoot him fatally, though he manages to kill them all before August arrives and he collapses dead. After encouraging Moses and Boo, Rosalee separates from them to find supplies to treat his injury, and runs into August, who tricks her into revealing the train after telling her he saw Zeke. However, he also reveals to her how to interpret part of the song they are following. The runaways regroup, and Rosalee reveals she gave up the train's location. They arrive at the train, but August has already arrived as well. Moses and Boo manage to board it, but Noah, Rosalee, Cato and Henry are forced to escape on foot. Meanwhile, back at the plantation, Tom interrogates the slaves, and treats Pearly Mae well in an attempt to get her to reveal where the escapees are heading. Sam gets an opportunity to kill Tom, but does not do it. Susanna Macon eventually convinces Pearly Mae to give up the slaves in exchange for freedom for herself and Boo, though not Moses. Since she and Susanna are half sisters and knowing Tom Macon looks after his family, including Rosalee and James, she agrees. However, Ernestine, not wanting Rosalee captured, kills her with poison in her drink and then slits her wrists with a table knife to make it look like suicide.
6	6	"Troubled Water"	Romeo Tirone	Jason Wilborn & Jennifer Yale	April 13, 2016	0.881
Tom invites a reverend to the Macon Plantation to support his campaign, but seems unable to please him, even after his new son Samuel is born. He later tries to force himself on Ernestine, but she leaves, admitting her disillusionment with her life and her murder of Pearly Mae to the reverend's slave. The runaways, starving, attempt to commandeer a gunboat which could contain food, but are caught by August and Ben. Though they escape in the boat, August breaks the rudder. They find the boat contains no food, and a man, who promises to help them escape via his Indian friend. Tensions rise between Noah and Cato, especially after Cato kicks the man overboard and reveals to Rosalee he knows she is Tom Macon's daughter. Rosalee later leaves, causing a confrontation between Noah and Cato. August and Ben travel to the town the boat will eventually float to, where August has sex with a prostitute, disgusting Ben. They are later found by a posse of slave catchers working for Patty Cannon, who try to force him to join them, but are forced to leave after getting a message that August's wife has escaped the mental institution. As the boat floats down the river, they are found by the slave catchers, but their pursuers are driven off by Native Americans, brought there by Rosalee. Meanwhile, John and Elizabeth enhance their home to allow runaway slaves to hide, which is observed by Kyle, who later enlists John to help catch a runaway in the area. The two men find the runaway, who turns out to be Clyde. He knocks out Kyle, allowing John get him safely away and claim he escaped. Later, after Clyde is captured, John decides to rescue him.
7	7	"Cradle"	Kate Woods	Misha Green & Joe Pokaski	April 20, 2016	0.946
August's wife escapes from the mental hospital she is in, forcing August and Ben to track her down. When they find her, Ben sees how badly his mother is affected. After they bring her back, Ben questions how good a man his father is. Moses and Boo continue to run, and he tells her the story of his Biblical namesake, but Moses is eventually shot by arrows when crossing a river, and dies after getting across. Boo escapes and eventually runs into Elizabeth, who shelters her while John is out of town, but she is discovered by Kyle. As Henry anticipates freedom, Cato rejects him, while he bonds with Noah and Rosalee, seemingly planning to become a family with them when they reach freedom. He sacrifices himself in an explosion to save Noah when they are attacked by slave catchers. On the plantation, James is forced to work, and manages to adapt. Sam protects him, and later tries to buy his freedom, and Ernestine tells him the truth about slavery. T.R. Macon, Tom and Susanna's son, also sees the harsh realities of slavery, eventually witnessing Sam escaping. He tries to maintain his friendship with James, promising to release him when he comes to own the plantation. When James refuses, T.R. tells his father he saw Sam escaping.
8	8	"Grave"	Kate Woods	Misha Green & Joe Pokaski	April 27, 2016	0.992
Rosalee treats Noah's injuries before they manage to escape with Cato, but he develops a fever. Rosalee hatches a plan to get medicine from a doctor's house by posing as free blacks, and forces Cato to help her by withholding the location of the next safe house. She manages to charm the doctor into letting them stay. August catches up with Patty Cannon's gang, and makes a deal to join them. When Ben questions his motives, he shows his son a bank letter supposedly telling them they have a month left to pay the mortgage on their house, and claims he has no choice, but Ben is unconvinced. They accompany the gang to town, where August discovers stolen clothes. Later, he discovers the bank letter actually says the bank wants to buy his land since it contains mercury. Rosalee convinces the doctor's house girl to help them, but the sheriff arrives, revealed to be the doctor's brother. He nearly catches them, but is drawn away by a report about Noah, who stumbles through a cornfield while hallucinating Henry. He gains the resolve to continue running, and escapes a slave catcher, reuniting with Cato. However, Rosalee is captured by August. Meanwhile, at the Macon Plantation, Sam is brought back after attempting escape. Tom decides to cripple him as a warning to future runaways, but is unable to go through with it. Later, after conversing with other southern men to support his bid for senator, he publicly lynches Sam during a speech announcing his bid. He later reprimands John for neither supporting him nor stopping him.
9	9	"Black & Blue"	Tim Hunter	Misha Green & Joe Pokaski	May 4, 2016	0.905
August and the gang plan to use Rosalee to draw out Noah and Cato, and she burns her stolen dress when they try to take it from her. Noah and Cato commandeer a wagon to rescue Rosalee. Cato finds money in the wagon, and claims to only be helping because Rosalee knows where to go, but Noah disputes this. Rosalee bonds with Ben, while the leader of the gang subtly hints to him that his father cares more about the job than anything else. Cato admits to Noah that he has a wife and daughter he was separated from, but claims he does not care about them anymore. Cato distracts the slave catchers by spreading the money from the wagon in front of them while Noah gets into the hideout. Ben finds the bank letter, and realizing his father lied to him, frees Rosalee. August finds Ernestine, and realizes he is hallucinating due to Devil's snare having been in the dress Rosalee burned. She causes him to realize he is obsessed with the hunt. Rosalee hallucinates Tom Macon, and reprimands him for his treatment of her. She eventually stabs him, but realizes she has actually stabbed Ben. August fights and nearly kills Noah, but stops when he hears Ben screaming, allowing Noah and Rosalee to escape, reuniting with Cato. They flee, pursued by the gang, but Cato is caught by an Indian trap. They fight back, but are forced to abandon Cato after he is shot with an arrow. Meanwhile, after managing to rescue Clyde from his old master, John returns home to find Boo, and Elizabeth admits what she and Kyle have done. When she reveals she has captured Kyle and is holding him in the hideaway, John angrily confronts him. Later, he and Elizabeth argue over what joining the Underground Railroad has done to them, and Boo nearly shoots John. They are then interrupted by the arrival of Noah and Rosalee, who Boo recognizes.
10	10	"The White Whale"	Tim Hunter	Misha Green & Joe Pokaski	May 11, 2016	1.012
The runaways at the Hawkes' residence are trapped when slave catchers flood the area. After digging a hole near a house, John tells Rosalee that Sam is dead, and she and Noah have sex. Afterward, they reflect on what they have done to get where they are. Noah and Elizabeth go to the marshal's office, where they stage a hostage situation and release all the captured runaways there. Meanwhile, after bringing Ben to a doctor, August kills the remaining gang members when they disagree with him on how to proceed, afterward going to John to get help, as he is Tom Macon's brother. He tells John that Rosalee is his niece, but leaves after Elizabeth returns and tells him where Noah was. He returns through the secret entrance to the hideaway and tries to kill them, but John enables them to escape by collapsing the hideaway. August flees, leaving John and Kyle. Meanwhile, Noah is captured by Patty Cannon. She interrogates him, and he claims Kyle is helping them. At the hideaway, John reveals to Kyle he and Elizabeth have planted evidence framing him, and kills him under the Fugitive Slave Act. August pursues Elizabeth, Boo and Rosalee, eventually confronting the latter over Ben, only for Elizabeth to arrive. In the standoff, August is shot, and the women leave him to die. He is later found by Patty Cannon, who has him arrested for killing her gang. At the Macon Plantation, Tom reveals he is haunted by his lynching of Sam, and begs Ernestine to forgive him. She seemingly does, and admits she killed Pearly Mae. After seeing Tom bond with James, she has him hanged and stages it as a suicide. Cato is revealed to still be running, and finds a suitcase full of money. Noah is sent to a jail with other slaves. Suzanna Macon admits she knew Ernestine was sleeping with Tom, but didn't care, but hated her because her children loved her more than their own mother, and sells her. Rosalee makes it to freedom with Boo, but tells Still she plans to go back to help other slaves do the same, having found a purpose. She returns, and meets Harriet Tubman.

=== Season 2 (2017) ===
No. overall	No. in season	Title	Directed by	Written by	Original release date	U.S. viewers (millions)
11	1	"Contraband"	Anthony Hemingway	Misha Green & Joe Pokaski	March 8, 2017	1.103
Five months after escaping north, a slave in Louisiana teaches himself to read. Rosalee helps other slaves escape, and is assisted by Harriet Tubman, who pays slave catchers to let them go. Noah is on trial for murder, but John defends him, arguing that since he is legally property, he must be extradited to Georgia. When Rosalee learns this and decides to rescue him, Tubman warns her how difficult it will be. John cryptically tells Noah Rosalee is coming. He later stops an escape attempt by Pete and Lou, two other slaves he is incarcerated with, and invites them to join his own escape. He is later shown making a ring, and claiming escape is not about where he goes anymore. Rosalee works undercover at a hospital, and steals medicine for one of the slaves, Valentine. Elizabeth joins a group of abolitionist women, led by Georgia Goodman, and learns how to use weapons. The judge decides to ignore federal law and finds Noah guilty of murder, forcing the group to rescue him, Pete and Lou at the hanging. They do, but Noah is recaptured by bounty hunters during the escape, while the other two are killed. John decides to run for a judge's seat, but he is killed by a bounty hunter after announcing his bid. Meanwhile, Ernestine is shown to have been sold to a plantation in South Carolina, and inhales fumes to help her survive the work days, which cause hallucinations of Pearly Mae, which eventually taunt her over being abused by her lover Hicks, telling her to kill herself.
12	2	"Things Unsaid"	Greg Yaitanes	Misha Green & Joe Pokaski	March 15, 2017	0.641
The slave in Louisiana tells his wife he can read, but she cautions him against letting others know. In the aftermath of John's murder, the Underground suffers. Rosalee leads a group of runaways to a safe house, but the owner lets her know it has been compromised by Patty Cannon's gang. Elizabeth suffers sanity slippage, wanting revenge for John, despite Valentine and Georgia's attempts to comfort her. On the way to another location, Noah attempts to escape from the bounty hunters, but fails. When they arrive, he captures and threatens the one he believes is the master, only to find that they were hired by Cato, now a free, wealthy man, before he is restrained. On the Rowe Plantation, Hicks tells Ernestine that another girl will need a favor, and she hallucinates her dead husband French, who later causes her to reflect on her mistakes raising her children after he died. The girl, Clara, is pregnant by Hicks, and needs a potion to abort the baby. She later changes her mind, but Hicks forces her to drink it anyway. Meanwhile, Patty Cannon is approached by a biographer wishing to record her story, and leads her gang to te safe house, expecting to catch Tubman. When they see Rosalee instead, she threatens the homeowner's son, forcing her to reveal that Rosalee is now known as "The Black Rose". Rosalee leads the group to a boat, but afterward, on the dock, she is shot by Cannon, falling into the river. She survives, and is revealed to be pregnant.
13	3	"Ache"	Anthony Hemingway	Misha Green & Joe Pokaski	March 22, 2017	0.563
The slave in Louisiana tells his daughter about freedom. In the woods, Rosalee removes the bullet and struggles on despite her injury, remembering her mother. Patty Cannon's gang pursues her, with Patty forcing the gang to do anything to bring her in. She eventually kills one of her pursuers after crossing a river. Cannon later tells her biographer that she believes Rosalee is connected to the Macon 7. Rosalee hides until the gang gets past her, but is bitten by a snake after revealing herself. The next morning, Cannon's biographer finds her and gives her water before returning to the gang. Later, Cannon tells him she has black members of her gang, and plans to recruit August Pullman to catch Rosalee. On the Rowe Plantation, Clara is shamed for having been pregnant out of wedlock, but does not reveal who the father is. Ernestine is set up to enter the master's house. She has a talk with the slaves' preacher, revealed to be Clara's father, about what to believe, and later hallucinates her husband's death, and Sam, who blames her for his own death. She later has a breakdown while entertaining the family. It is also revealed that she prevented herself from having more children after James was born. She eventually attempts suicide, but is saved by the other slaves.
14	4	"Nok Aaut"	Salli Richardson	Nadria Tucker & Tiffany Greshler	March 29, 2017	0.476
Flashbacks reveal Cato became wealthy, free and adopted the last name Powell, as well as traveled to London and met Devi, who accepted him despite his past, but later abandoned her before returning to America, unable to move on. In the present, the slave who can read, Daniel, tells another slave about John Brown. Rosalee returns to Georgia's house, injured, as Elizabeth shows further signs of sanity slippage, and later joins another abolitionist in destroying voting booths, and speaks out against slavery in Georgia's place. Noah and Cato, at a restaurant, insult each other over the past and present. When Noah says he would do everything again if he could, Cato offers to buy the freedom of several slaves if Noah goes back into slavery. Noah is unable to go through with it, and later fights Cato over forcing him to choose. Eventually he threatens Cato, telling him that by acting like a white man, he has joined them in abusing slaves, before being taken away. Noah is taken to William Still, who reveals he knows his story, though Noah claims he is a fraud. Still, however, tells him he gave the others a choice to fight for freedom. It is revealed that Cato put the other slaves on a boat to Canada with freedom papers, and that he intends to go against American law.
15	5	"Whiteface"	Kate Woods	Story by : Devon Greggory & Ben Cory Jones; Teleplay by : Misha Green & Joe Pokaski	April 5, 2017	0.594
Elizabeth writes to Still, admitting to being inspired by John Brown's way of revolution. When Georgia is arrested, she discovers Georgia is a free mulatto passing as a white woman. When they decide to move the other runaways, Noah arrives and reunites with Rosalee. She informs him she plans to return to Macon to rescue Ernestine and James, and asks him to go with her. Elizabeth, knowing of Rosalee's pregnancy, urges Noah not to go with her. Noah later agrees to go with her, and proposes to her using the ring he made, which she accepts. Elizabeth is later assaulted by anti-abolitionists, who scar her back. In Philadelphia, Cato hosts a party for abolitionists, including Still, where he claims money is the way to fight slavery. He meets Frederick Douglass, as well as Cannon and August, who recognize him and later capture him and Devi after forcing him to tell them how to catch Rosalee. Cannon sends Smoke and August to retrieve Ernestine. On the Rowe Plantation, Clara asks Ernestine to help her become the owner's mistress. Ernestine obliges and begins teaching her how to win the master's affections. Hicks attempts to reconcile with her, but she rejects him. When Clara succeeds, Ernestine asks her to get the master to help her escape.
16	6	"Minty"	Anthony Hemingway	Misha Green & Joe Pokaski	April 12, 2017	0.379
Harriet Tubman, in front of Philadelphia abolitionists, reflects on a life lived with conviction, compassion, and courage.
17	7	"28"	Anthony Hemingway	Misha Green & Joe Pokaski	April 19, 2017	0.500
Daniel is caught teaching another slave to read. Cannon tortures Cato, and threatens Devi to force him to help her and a few corrupt magistrates abduct and sell free blacks into slavery. After Devi finds out he captured a free man, she becomes disgusted by him and seems done with him for good. He sends her into slavery. Rosalee and Noah arrive on the Macon plantation and force Frog Jack to help them rescue James and Ernestine. When Rosalee discovers her mother is no longer the head house slave, she starts to act recklessly. Noah brings Corra, now a field slave, to help, who tells them Ernestine was sold and James is now in the house again. They decide on a plan to inform James and find out where Ernestine is. When Corra does not return to them in time, they go ahead with the plan. Noah retrieves a book containing information on sold slaves from overseer Bill, but Rosalee is captured when James turns her in, not wanting to go with her. When Bill attempts to punish Rosalee, Noah tries to shoot him. Rosalee notices, and stops him by revealing her pregnancy. On the Rowe Plantation, Clara manipulates Matthew into declaring the fumes contraband and punishing anyone caught with them, including Hicks. She later asks Ernestine to make a poison to kill Hicks for forcing her to abort her baby, and threatens to have Matthew keep her off the mainland if she refuses. When Clara's father tries to reprimand her for her relationship with Matthew, Ernestine tells him Clara has suffered. Clara confronts Ernestine, admitting she still despises her for making the potion that killed her baby. Ernestine, in turn, admits she knew the poison was for her, not Hicks, and gave her a fake one. Clara manipulates Matthew into punishing Ernestine, but she is one step ahead, bribing a boat captain with expensive whiskey to take her off the island. However, once on the mainland, she is captured by August.
18	8	"Auld Acquaintance"	Christopher Meloni	Story by : Ben Cory Jones; Teleplay by : Misha Green & Joe Pokaski	April 26, 2017	0.494
Daniel is shown to have been blinded following his captors realizing he could read. James is shown to enjoy his life as a Macon, as he is treated like the favorite child, despite Rosalee's suffering. After Corra tells him James betrayed them, Noah creates a plan to hold Suzanna hostage to rescue Rosalee and James, but realizes they will need help. They decide to recruit a slave who will be allowed into the Macon house for dinner that Christmas night. Noah later intimidates James into helping by telling him what family is. When he returns to the house, James protects Rosalee, telling her Noah is coming, but refuses to join her, calling the Macons his family. Noah kills overseer Bill, and after deciding not to use anyone else, enters the house and kidnaps Suzanna, Rosalee and James. When T.R. tries to interfere, Noah shoots, him, and he accidentally shoots his mother. They escape after Rosalee blows up the house, ensuring there will be nothing to go back to. Ernestine, August and Smoke are forced to abandon their boat and continue by land, and she attempts escape. Ernestine and August later bond over their shared guilt as parents. That night, Ernestine tries to escape, and August kills Smoke when they try to recapture her, later bringing her south. Elizabeth and Georgia try to raise money for the cause, but their efforts meet little success, though Harriet encourages Elizabeth. They later rob a pro-slavery church to gain funds. This leads to Elizabeth blackmailing an old friend to support the cause. Cato tells Patty Cannon the song the Macon 7 followed to help her discern the path runaways follow. Later, still working for Cannon, he arrives at Georgia’s boarding house through the tunnel.
19	9	"Citizen"	Lawrence Trilling	Misha Green & Joe Pokaski	May 3, 2017	0.443
Cato, who is gathering intel for Patty, has a brief encounter with Harriet, who the first to mistrust his real motives. He also discovers Rosalee is returning soon. After being pressured by Cannon, he cuts his wrists to garner more sympathy, and capitalizes on Elizabeth’s grief. He later sees Elizabeth leave at night, and follows her, finding a burning barn with a dead man inside. He returns to Cannon's gang, and tells them they have two days, referring to the time Rosalee will return. Elizabeth becomes more unhinged when someone who assaulted her shows up on Georgia’s doorstep. Georgia warns her not to do anything, but after her conversation with Cato, she retaliates, burning the man’s property. When his son goes in to save his father, Elizabeth tries to save him. they are both saved by Georgia, but after Elizabeth expresses no remorse over what she has done, Georgia kicks her out. Tubman tells Georgia she does not trust Cato, and travels south to Philadelphia to tell her story. She later gets to another safe house, and meets Noah. Noah, Rosalee, James and Corra arrive at a safe house, but they are found, and Corra is shot in the back and taken away. The others journey to Ohio, with Noah and Rosalee telling James what freedom will be like. They meet Harriet in Virginia, who tells Noah he must find the belief he has lost. Later Noah blames Rosalee for putting their child in danger, comparing her to her father. Daniel tries to find ways to keep his family together, and eventually decides to seek John Brown in Ripley, Ohio. He makes it to Ripley, and gets to a cobbler shop, where a sympathetic cobbler directs him to Georgia's boarding house.
20	10	"Soldier"	Anthony Hemingway	Misha Green & Joe Pokaski	May 10, 2017	0.479
Harriet receives a message from John Brown to join his raid on Harper's Ferry. Daniel asks the group for help liberating his wife and children, which they agree to. Rosalee admits Noah was right about her, while Noah reveals he has regained his resolve, though he doesn't know if he can forgive her. Several abolitionists, including Noah and Elizabeth, attack three plantations at once to free Daniel's family and other slaves. They succeed, though Elizabeth kills one of the masters when he tries to retaliate. When the abolitionists regroup, Noah leads them and the liberated slaves in fighting their oppressors. While they are out, Patty Cannon and her gang arrive at the boarding house demanding Rosalee. After the gang compromises the tunnel and captures Georgia and the others, Rosalee and James take refuge in a room of the boarding house, caught by Cato, who denies where she goes into labor and has her baby. Cato, who has already been making plans with a woman claiming to be Patty Cannon, forges a note written by Harriet Tubman and leads Cannon to a remote location, with only Cannon’s biographer as witness, he shoots her and reveals his intention to become the new ringleader of Cannon’s gang, replacing her with the other woman. He then returns and gets Rosalee to reveal herself by threatening to kill Georgia. She does so, but hides James and her baby, who are found by Noah and Elizabeth when they return. Ernestine and August arrive at his home to find it empty, his wife and slave dead. Ernestine gives him drugs to cope with the pain, only to take advantage of his inebriated state to escape. He pursues her back to the Macon plantation, only for them to find it burned to the ground. She later talks him out of killing himself. Ten months later, Elizabeth has seduced a man who works as a guard at Harpers Ferry Armory, signaling to her confederates for the raid after he leaves her in the morning.

== Critical reception ==
On review aggregator website Rotten Tomatoes, the first season of Underground holds an approval rating of 93% with an average score of 7.3/10 based on 30 reviews. The site's critics consensus reads, "Underground blends credible terror with enough compelling thrills to overcome the storyline's occasional cliches." On Metacritic, the first season has a weighted average score of 75 out of 100, based on 32 critics, indicating "generally favorable reviews". Dan Fienberg of The Hollywood Reporter gave the first season a positive review, stating that "Underground is a thriller, an adventure yarn, before it's a Brussels sprouts message drama." Joshua Alston of The A.V. Club gave the series an A− and wrote: "Underground benefits from its deliberate pacing. This is, after all, a heist story, except that the thieves are literally stealing their own bodies. All the components of a tense thriller are here." Mekeisha Madden Toby of The Wrap praising for its story, cast and writing which makes this series worth the investment.

Rotten Tomatoes reported that the second season of Underground holds an approval rating of 100%, with an average score of 7.7/10 based on 10 reviews. The site's critics consensus reads, "Anchored by terrific performances, Underground's sophomore season shows no signs of slipping, tapping into the same sense of urgency without sacrificing its rich characterization." On Metacritic, the second season has a weighted average score of 79 out of 100, based on 4 critics, indicating "generally favorable reviews".

== See also ==
- List of films featuring slavery
- The Underground Railroad (TV series)
