= Jeff Pollack (music executive) =

American music executive

- Occupations: Music and media expert and TV/film producer
- Known for: CEO of Pollack Media Group

Jeff Pollack is an American music executive and film/TV producer. He is currently the head of Pollack Music & Media Group.

== Career ==
As a producer, Pollack has participated in music and charity events over the past decade including U2/Green Day's Music Rising performance at the NFL's reopening game at the Mercedes-Benz Superdome, Live 8, Live Aid, Live Earth, Movies Rock (Emmy-winner), the 2002 Salt Lake City Olympics, the 70th anniversary of the Apollo, and many others.

Jeff served as creative music consultant for the MGM TV series Fame L.A., which garnered an Emmy Award nomination for its theme song; executive music consultant on Pavorotti's televised concert event for Bosnian war victims featuring U2 and others; co-producer of NetAid; co-executive producer of Billboard Music Awards honoring George Harrison; executive producer of Love Rocks.

As a music supervisor, Pollack has worked on over thirty-five films, five of which received Academy Award nominations for Best Original Song, with Crazy Heart's "The Weary Kind" winning the Oscar.

Other music supervision film credits: Music Supervisor on the soundtrack for the film Glen Campbell: I'll Be Me and Oscar nominated song "I'm Not Gonna Miss You". Music Supervisor on the film August Rush and Oscar nominated song "Raise it Up". Music Supervisor on Oscar-nominated film As Good As It Gets (1997). Music Consultant on Oscar-nominated film Sleepless in Seattle (1993) and Oscar nominated song "Wink and a Smile". Music Consultant on the film Robin Hood: Prince of Thieves (1991 and Oscar nominated song "Everything I Do (I'll Do It For You)".

Jeff’s music consultant credits include: The Space Between Us (2017), Constantine (2005), Love Actually (2003), Lara Croft Tomb Raider: the Cradle of Life (2003), Red Planet (2000), First Wives Club (1996), You've Got Mail (1998), The Craft (1996), Multiplicity (1996), Moll Flanders (1996), To Die For (1995), The Net (1995), Bad Boys (1995), My Girl II (1994), Threesome (1994), I'll Do Anything (1994), It Could Happen To You (1994), Groundhog Day (1993), In the Line of Fire (1993), Hero (1992), Bram Stoker’s Dracula (1992), Mo' Money (1992).

In 2015, Pollack was a producer on the Alex Gibney-directed, Emmy-nominated HBO film about Frank Sinatra All or Nothing At All. He also served as an associate producer and music supervisor on the Glen Campbell film I'll Be Me, which featured two Grammy-winning songs, including "I'm Not Going to Miss You" which was also nominated for an Oscar for Best Song. I'll Be Me also recently won a 2016 Grammy for the Best Compilation Soundtrack for Visual Media.

Recent projects include executive producing Satan and Adam, the documentary The Gift: The Journey of Johnny Cash which was released on YouTube Originals in November 2019, and the Emmy-nominated 2-part documentary Laurel Canyon: A Place in Time, which premiered on MGM+ in May 2020. Jeff was also an executive producer on the Netflix hip-hop competition Rhythm + Flow featuring Cardi B, T.I., and Chance the Rapper, which premiered on Netflix in October 2019 and won the award for "Outstanding Reality Program, Reality Competition or Game Show" at the 51st NAACP Image Awards. In 2021, Jeff was a producer on the 6-part documentary series McCartney: 3,2,1 featuring Paul McCartney & Rick Rubin, which premiered on Hulu. Most recently, Jeff helped produce Trap Jazz on Hulu and San Francisco Sounds: A Place in Time on MGM+. Pollack is currently an executive producer on Season 2 of Rhythm + Flow which is set to be released in the fall of 2024.
