= Edward Downman =

Edward Andrews Downman or Edward Andrew Downman (died 24 October 1931) was an English Anglican clergyman and antiquary.

Educated at Southwark College, Downman was ordained in 1885 and curate of St Chad's, Everton from 1885 to 1887. Several archives contain his drawings of ancient earthworks.

== Works ==
- History of Bolsover, 1895
- Ancient Church Bells in England, 1898
- Plans of Ancient Earthworks, 1901–1915
- English pottery and porcelain: A handbook for the collector, 1918
- Blue Dash Chargers and other English Tin Enamel Circular Dishes, 1919
