= Lisa Davina Phillip =

British actress and singer

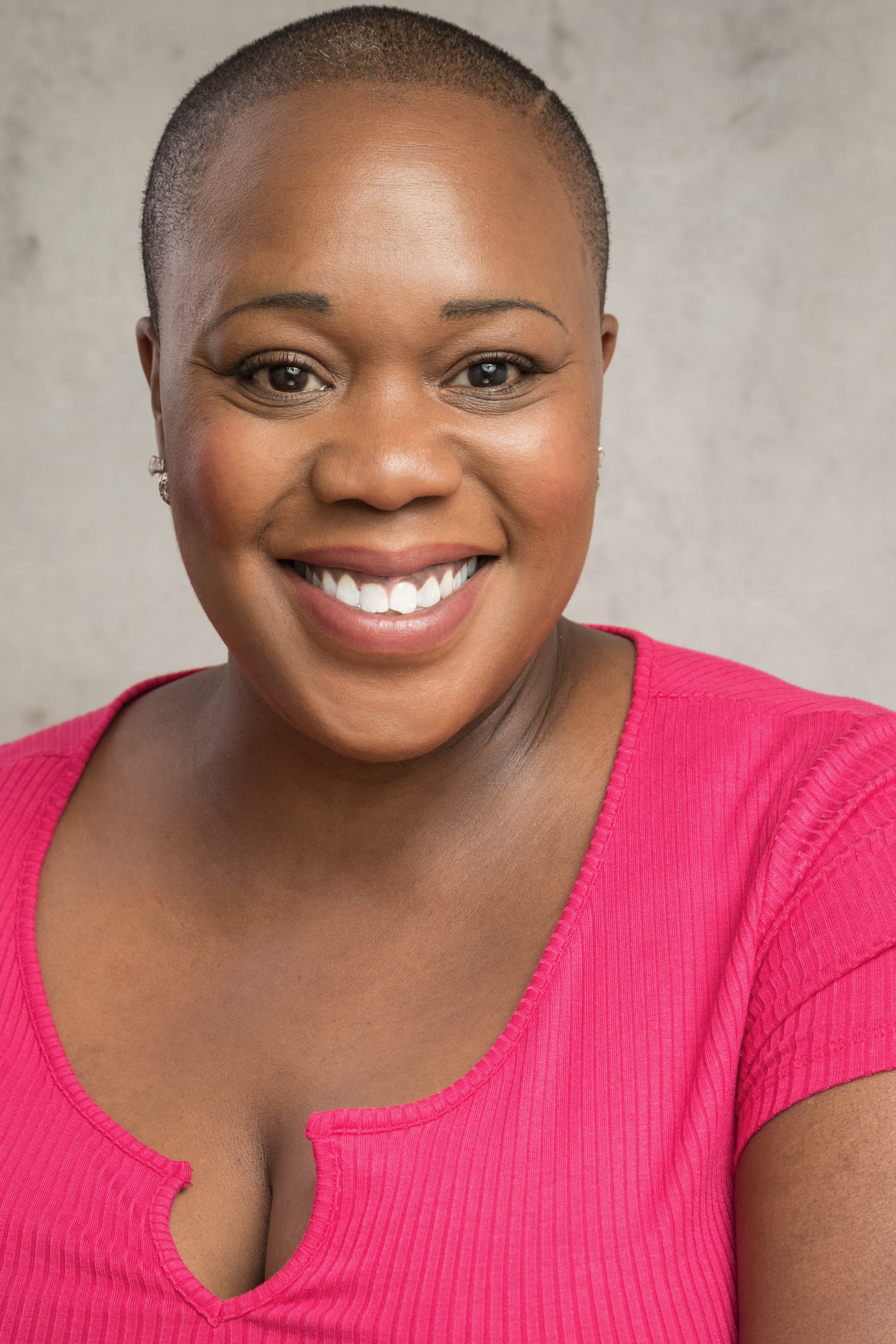
- Born: Lisa Davina Phillip; United Kingdom
- Occupation(s): Actress, singer
- Years active: 2004–present
- Children: 1

Lisa Davina Phillip is a British actress and singer.

Phillip began acting in her early teens, when she appeared in various productions for local theatre group Second Wave Centre For Youth Arts. She then studied Drama, Media and Popular Culture at University College Northampton, and went on to train as an actress at the Academy Drama School in London, where she was the recipient of the Stage Scholarship.

== Radio ==
In 2003, she was a runner-up for the BBC’s Norman Beaton Fellowship. This led to radio work, including Mrs Wilkes in A Kind of Home: James Baldwin in Paris (alongside Ronald Pickup), and readings of Alice Walker and Tony White for BBC Radio 4’s Open Book. Other roles include Sylvia in Madame Tempy and Dolly McPherson in Maya Angelou’s A Song Flung up To Heaven part of The Amazing Maya Angelou, winner of 'Outstanding Contribution' at the BBC Audio Drama Awards 2020.

Other voiceover work includes the lead role of teenage prostitute Macy in Jillian Li-Sue's harrowing, award-winning short film Laters (BBC Three).

== Theatre ==
Theatre credits include: Alphonsine in The Rwandan Testimonies (World Music) (Donmar Warehouse), Edna Mitchell in Waiting For Lefty (BAC) and Swing/Understudy for Shenzi and Rafiki in The Lion King (Lyceum Theatre). In 2006, she appeared in Trevor Nunn's acclaimed musical production of the Gershwins' Porgy and Bess (Savoy Theatre), and other theatre roles include Pat in Catalysta at the (Oval House Theatre), alongside Carmen Munroe and Angela Wynter, and Mrs Phelps in Matilda The Musical (Cambridge Theatre).

She appeared as part of the original London cast of Ghost the Musical, which, after a world premiere run in Manchester, opened in the West End 19 July 2011. Phillip originated the role of Clara in the production, as well as understudying Sharon D. Clarke in the principal role of Oda Mae Brown. She has had many opportunities to play Oda Mae, most notably when Clarke suffered a minor knee injury and was away for seven weeks, Phillip shared the role with Da'Vine Joy Randolph.

Phillips has also appeared in the British Christmas tradition of pantomime in consecutive years since 2015 with appearances including Ashcroft Theatre, Croydon; Lyceum Theatre, Sheffield; and the Alban Arena.

== Television ==
Phillip has made number of appearances on television with credits including: Pearl McDonald (series regular) in The Royal Today; Reverend Kathryn Ripley BBC soap opera Doctors; Mrs Barratt in Apple Tree House (CBeebies) and an appearance in the BBC hit Sunday night drama Call The Midwife. Phillip often plays comedy roles including: Revd. Susan Walker the People Just Do Nothing; Nurse Kirwan in This way Up and Head Nurse Bev in Sky TV's Bloods. Phillip returns to Netflix in 2022 as inmate Pat Pat in the mockumentary Hard Cell with Catherine Tate. Then in March 2023, she appeared in another episode of the BBC soap opera Doctors as Liz Stanton.

== Film ==
In 2020, Phillip made her film debut in the Christmas musical fantasy Jingle Jangle: A Christmas Journey playing the character of Ms. Johnston opposite Forest Whitaker. The film was released on Netflix on 13 November 2020. Phillip's plays Auntie Valrie in her Christmas film Boxing Day, the first black British romcom, written, directed, produced and starring Aml Ameen with Leigh-Anne Pinnock and Aja Naomi King.
