= Nick Petford =

British academic (born 1961)

Professor Nick Petford DSc, DL
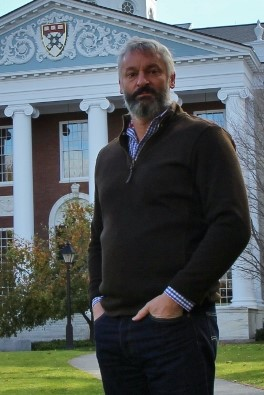
- Born: Nicholas Petford; 27 May 1961 (age 65); Friern Barnet, London, England
- Education: University of Liverpool, Goldsmiths, University of London
- Occupation: Consultant
- Television: The Volcano that Stopped the World, Krakatoa Revealed, Top 10 Natural Disasters
- Board member of: Former chair: Northamptonshire Health and Wellbeing Board, Director: Fluvial Innovations, Investment Committee Trustee: UnLtd, Venture Partner, Emerge Education
- Awards: Murchison Fund, Geological Society of London, Hon. DSc Amity University, India, Visiting Professor Macquarie University, Australia, Communication University of China
- Website: uk.linkedin.com/in/nick-petford-9331aa9

Nicholas Petford (born 27 May 1961, London, England) is a British academic and former Vice-Chancellor of the University of Northampton. Previously he was Pro-Vice-Chancellor (Research and Enterprise) at Bournemouth University and before that Professor of Earth and Planetary Sciences at Kingston University. He has also worked for BP and on academic and commercial research projects throughout the world. As an academic he is known for his expertise in magmatic systems and volcanology. His publicly available Google Scholar Nick Petford account records over 200 journal articles, pieces of journalism, published abstracts and book chapters in this and other fields. He is a deputy lieutenant for Northamptonshire and in 2021 was granted Freedom of the City of London.

== Personal life ==
Petford grew up in Hayes West London, before moving to the Hiltingbury district of Chandlers Ford where he went to The Mountbatten School, a comprehensive, near Southampton. His family come from the Kentish Town and Islington areas of North London. His maternal grandmother was Ashkenazi Jewish and her daughters, Nick's identical twin aunties, were long-standing variety and music hall performers. He is married with three children.

== Career ==
Nick Petford left school at 16, training as a refrigeration engineer and then working in retail, before doing an Access Course in Science at Southwark College. This led to reading Geology at Goldsmiths, University of London (1984–1987). He received a PhD from the University of Liverpool in 1991 and a DSc in 2009. He holds an honorary DSc from Amity University, a private university based in India, is Visiting Professor at Macquarie University, Sydney and the Communication University of China (Beijing).

Petford is a former Royal Society University Research Fellow and Fellow of Churchill College, Cambridge. His contributions to the media on volcanoes include appearances on Sky News, BBC TV and Radio, the Richard and Judy show and National Geographic's "Top 10 Natural Disasters". In 2005, the BBC referred to the work of his research team in a documentary Krakatoa Revealed. During the 2010 eruption of Iceland's Eyjafjallajökull volcano he fronted the Channel 4 documentary The Volcano That Stopped Britain.

In 2018, the University opened the £330 million Waterside Campus, one of the largest relocation projects in the UK higher education sector. The relocation was financed primarily by a public bond issue trading on the Irish Stock Exchange. Since opening, the Campus has won a number of significant architectural awards. The restoration of a Grade II listed Engine Shed was particularly well reviewed, funding for this aspect of the campus build was received from the Heritage Lottery Fund. On 24 September 2021, the university announced that after nearly 12 years Petford would step down as Vice-Chancellor in 2022.

== Music ==
In 1977, Nick Petford co-founded Strate Jacket, Southampton's first punk band, although he only featured in the first line up and left before they released their first single. He also contributed to Stick It in Your Ear, a fanzine-based, cassette-only label based in Southampton devoted to local Southampton music, which had a policy of releasing a small number of cassettes, for free, of any music sent to it by local musicians. Its aim was to reflect and support the city's diverse music genres and encourage others to follow by example. Over seven years, it released 43 cassette items with Petford contributing two self-penned cassettes: Smile Please (This Is England) and Minerva Terrace, both released in 1983.

== Controversies ==
Nick Petford's Who's Who entry lists one of his hobbies as crowd surfing. This is a reference to a Students' Union event in 2014 hosted by Simon Brodkin as Lee Nelson, where he agreed to crowd surf and join in a speed drinking contest. This incident, reported in the media, was criticised by the University of Northampton University and College Union (UCU) (the recognised trade union which represents academic and teaching staff at the university) but supported by two of the students present.

In 2015, concerned about the debt level created by the relocation to the Waterside campus, the University of Northampton UCU held a vote of no confidence in members of the University's senior management team (including Professor Nick Petford as Vice-Chancellor). The majority voted that they had no confidence. However, this symbolic and non-binding vote was dismissed by the University's governing body because the bond instrument was underwritten by a HM Treasury guarantee scheme, meaning the UK Government would repay the loan should the University be unable to do so.

Petford has been known to at times express controversial viewpoints. These have included criticising local journalists who had reported on financial irregularities at the former Northamptonshire County Council; describing himself as a 'cavalier chancellor'; and retweeting individual student viewpoints, that dismissed UCU's criticism of the speed drinking and crowd-surfing incident. Under Nick Petford's tenure, in November 2021, and again in April 2022 UCU members of the academic staff voted to strike. Although these were national ballots, the University of Northampton stood out as one of very few post-1992 universities to do so.

== Other roles ==
Petford is a Fellow of the Geological Society of London, American Geophysical Union, Fellow of the Royal Society of Arts and was Vice-President of the Mineralogical Society of Great Britain and Ireland (2002–2004). From 2012 to 2015 he chaired a Universities UK Task & Finish Group looking at procurement and social value.

His career turns were included as part of a BBC Radio 4 show, Whatever Happened To? in August 2018, along with two former classmates John Russell and Dave Coombs from their City and Guilds refrigeration course at Eastleigh Technical College in 1977. In 2018, he was referred to in a The Guardian article on state school educated University Vice-Chancellors. During Covid Lockdown he presented a monthly radio show and podcast Shout to the Top on NLive Radio, a community radio station run by the University of Northampton. The podcast versions, including the final one with Glen Matlock, Bob Harris, Jah Wobble and Richards Coles, on Punk music, are available on Spotify.

== Edited publications ==
- Jerram. D & Petford, N (2011), The Field Description of Igneous Rocks. The Geological Field Guide Series, Wiley‐Blackwell, West Sussex, UK 256 pp.
- Petford, N., Sparks, R.S.J., Hutton, D.H.W. 2008, (Eds), Plutons and Batholiths, Trans. R. Soc. Edinburgh. 97, Part 4, 297–477.
- Thompson, K & Petford, N, 2008, (Eds) Structure and Emplacement of High-Level Magmatic Systems: Geol. Soc. London. Spec Pub. 302, 227 pp.
- Petford, N. 2006, (Ed), Post-Perovskite Workshop, Tokyo Institute of Technology, Visual Geosciences, DOI 10.1007/s10069-006-0001-0.
- Breitkreuz, C. & Petford, N., &. 2004, (Eds), Physical Geology of Subvolcanic Intrusions. Geol. Soc. London. Spec Pub, 225.
- Petford, N. & McCaffrey, K.J.W. 2003, (Eds), Hydrocarbons in Crystalline Rocks. Geol. Soc. London Spec. Pub. 215.
- Brown, M., Petford, N. and Schilling, F.R. 2001 (Eds), Crustal Melting and Granite Magmatism: Causes and Behaviours from Pores to Plutons. Phys. Chem. Earth, (A) 26, No. 4-5, 201–367.
- David, C., Petford, N. & Risnes, R. 2001 (Eds), Compaction, Subsidence and the Mechanics of Granular Materials, Phys. Chem. Earth (A) 26, No. 1-2, 3–111.
