= Can You Dig This =

2015 United States documentary film

- Directed by: Delila Vallot
- Produced by: Chris Leggett; Rafael Marmor
- Cinematography: J.B. Rutagarama & Delila Vallot
- Edited by: Asako Ushio
- Release date: June 11, 2015
- Running time: 94 minutes
- Country: United States
- Language: English

Can You Dig This is a 2015 American documentary film directed by Delila Vallot. The main focus of this film is urban farming as the main character plants a food garden in his home.

== Synopsis ==
The story is an inspiration one that aims to motivate people everywhere to plant as the lead character plants an urban garden in his home in South Central Los Angeles.

== Reception ==
- African Movie Academy Awards (2016) — Best Diaspora Documentary [Nominated]
- Los Angeles Film Festival (2015) — LA Muse Award

=== Release ===
The film was later made available for community-initiated theatrical screenings through Gathr’s Theatrical On Demand platform, which allows screenings to occur in local venues once a minimum number of advance tickets are reserved.
