= University of Northampton =

Public university in Northampton, England

Coordinates: 52.2506°N 0.8903°W

The University of Northampton
- Coat of arms
- Former names: University College Northampton, Nene College of Higher Education (1975), Northampton Technical College (1924)
- Motto: Latin: Ne Nesciamus
- Motto in English: Let us not be ignorant
- Type: Public
- Established: 2005 (gained University status); 1975 (Nene College established)
- Endowment: £0.95 m (2015)
- Chancellor: Richard Coles
- Vice-Chancellor: Anne-Marie Kilday
- Administrative staff: 1,048
- Students: 13,505 (2024/25)
- Undergraduates: 10,685 (2024/25)
- Postgraduates: 2,820 (2024/25)
- Location: Northampton, Northamptonshire, UK
- Website: northampton.ac.uk

The University of Northampton is a public university based in Northampton, Northamptonshire, England. It was formed in 1975 as Nene College of Higher Education by the amalgamation of a number of training colleges and gained university college status as University College Northampton in 1999 and full university status as the University of Northampton in 2005.

== History ==
=== 13th century University of Northampton ===
The town had a university in medieval times between 1261 and 1265 of the same name, established by royal charter after approval from King Henry III in 1261. It was the third university in England, after Oxford and Cambridge, and the 22nd in Europe. After being advised by bishops and magnates that Northampton was a threat to Oxford, Henry III dissolved the university in 1265, and signed a Royal Decree that banned the establishment of a university in Northampton.

=== Northampton Technical College ===
Northampton Technical College was opened at St George's Avenue—now the site of the Avenue Campus—in 1924. Eight years later, a new building for the college was formally opened by the Duke and Duchess of York. A School of Art opened later in 1937.

The entrance to Avenue Campus

=== The College of Education and Nene College of Higher Education ===
At the beginning of the 1970s, Northamptonshire was one of the few counties in England to lack a teacher-training college. A college in Liverpool lost its home and was transferred to what is now the Park Campus. The College of Education was opened by the Secretary of State for Education and Science, Margaret Thatcher, in 1972. In 1975, this college amalgamated with the Colleges of Technology and Art to become Nene College of Higher Education, taking its name from the River Nene. In 1978, it integrated the Leathersellers College from London.

In 1993, the college incorporated St Andrew's School of Occupational Therapy and was granted undergraduate degree awarding powers. In 1997, it took in the Sir Gordon Roberts College of Nursing and Midwifery.

=== University College Northampton and University of Northampton ===
It became University College Northampton in 1999 and gained full university status in 2005. To gain university status it had to convince the Privy Council that a Royal Decree banning the establishment of a university in Northampton, signed by King Henry III in 1265 following the Battle of Lewes, should be repealed. In 2005, the university also received the power to validate its own research degrees, which had formerly been validated by the University of Leicester. In the graduation ceremonies in July 2006, seven students received the first doctoral degrees validated by the University of Northampton.

In January 2010, the School of Applied Sciences was renamed the School of Science and Technology and moved into the newly refurbished Newton Building at Avenue Campus. The Newton Building was officially opened in September 2010 by Princess Anne.

== History 2010 onwards ==
Until 2018 the university had three main sites: Avenue Campus, just north of the town centre, opposite a large open park known as the Racecourse; Park Campus in Kingsthorpe to the north of the town which was the main and largest campus and an Innovation centre opposite Northampton railway station. In May 2012, the university announced plans to establish a new riverside campus in the town centre, on the site of the disused Northampton Power Station on the south bank of the River Nene and located within the Northampton Waterside Enterprise Zone (known simply as Northampton Waterside). The Waterside Campus opened to students in September 2018 with the facilities on both Park and Avenue campuses transferring to it.

The main student halls of residence are now located in the student village of the Waterside Campus, and include Francis Crick; Margaret Bondfield; John Clare; and Charles Bradlaugh. A former ground-floor flat in the latter is a multi-faith Chaplaincy Centre, and another in John Clare houses the Centre for Community Volunteering; Bassett-Lowke. A 464-room hall of residence 'St John's Halls of Residence' opened in 2014 and mainly accommodates international and post-graduate students. In November 2023 student protests at the 'unsafe and unsanitary conditions' in these halls were reported on by the BBC. In December 2023 under Prof Anne-Marie Kilday's tenure as Vice Chancellor, the university announced the closure of the Institute for Creative Leather Technologies. This had been based at the university due to a long tradition of leather working as the primary industry in Northampton.

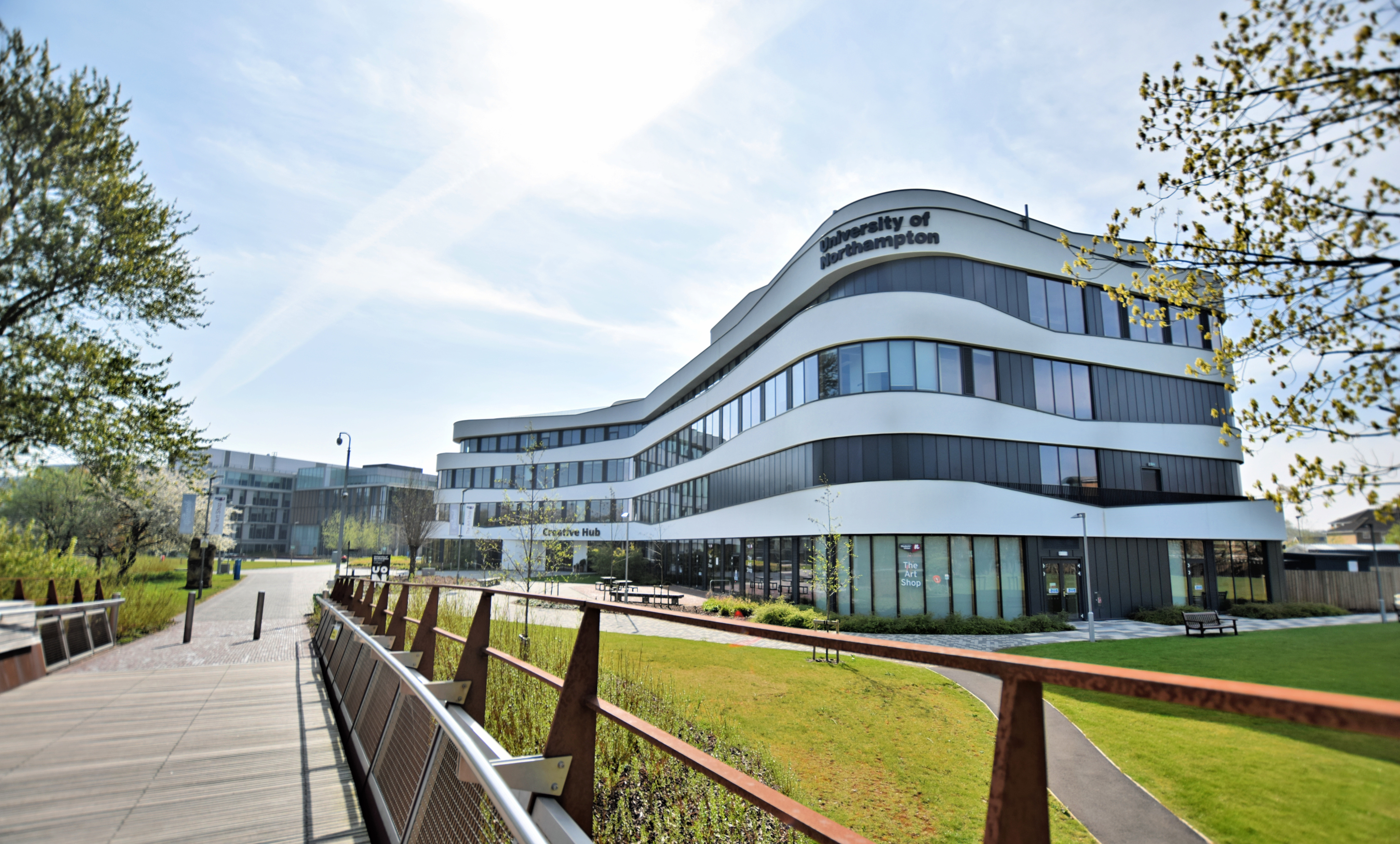
The new Waterside Campus

== Organisation and administration ==
=== Governance ===
The Vice-Chancellor is Anne-Marie Kilday, who was preceded in the post by Nick Petford, Ann Tate (who received an honorary degree from the university in 2011) and Martin Gaskell.

On 10 February 2008, the university appointed Baroness Falkner of Margravine as its first Chancellor. In July 2017, she was succeeded by the BBC radio presenter Richard Coles.

The Board of Governors are the members of the Higher Education Corporation and act both as governors and charitable trustees. There are 17 members of the Board of Governors. They are drawn from the private, public and voluntary sectors as well as from the staff and students of the university.

== Academic profile ==
The university had 12,060 students in 2024/25. It is divided into three faculties: the Faculty of Business & Law (FBL), the Faculty of Education, Arts, Science & Technology (FEAST), the Faculty of Health, Sport, & Behavioural Sciences (FHSBS).

The university offers a wide range of undergraduate degrees, foundation degrees, diplomas and a variety of postgraduate opportunities up to PhD level.

=== Reputation and rankings ===
Rankings
National rankings
- Complete (2027): 121
- Guardian (2027): 78
- Times / Sunday Times (2027): 118

Global rankings
- QS (2027): 1201–1400
- THE (2026): 1501+

In February 2013, the university received international recognition for its commitment to social innovation and entrepreneurship by being designated a 'Changemaker Campus' by Ashoka U. Northampton was the first Changemaker Campus in the UK and joins a global network of 21 other Changemaker Campuses.

=== Research ===
Research, consultancy and knowledge transfer at the university are centred on a number of cognate research groupings. It carries out internationally renowned research into lift engineering and technology, using the Express Lift Tower in the town, reflecting the town's historic role in lift manufacturing.

== Student life ==
=== Students' Union ===
The Students' Union operates out of the redeveloped Engine Shed location on the Waterside Campus, which also operates as a daytime cafe and food outlet. The Students' Union is led by five full-time Sabbatical Officers, backed by volunteers including an extended Elected Officer Team of Part Time Officers and is supported by almost 200 staff – both student and career staff.

=== Sports ===
The Students' Union has 35 sports clubs and enters 24 teams in Wednesday BUCS Leagues each week. The Students' Union operate on a policy of free sports membership, meaning all teams are free to join with no membership fee and offers a wide variety of sports including rugby league (Gremlins RL), football, netball, basketball, hockey and lacrosse. They are also one of a select SUs to offer equestrian as a sports club for their students. Sports is overseen by the Sports Coordinator with an elected Sports Part-Time Officer acting as a representative for the voice of student sports.

Since the start of the 2018–19 academic year, the Students' Union has contested a Varsity event against the University of Bedfordshire, with each institute taking it in turns to host the event each year. The SU also hosts an end of year Sports Awards event to recognise the achievement of all clubs, with awards including both performance based awards as well as charity and individual awards.

=== Societies ===
Approximately 60 student societies are affiliated with The University of Northampton Students’ Union. These range from special interest societies such as eSports & Gaming, Anime, or Crochet, to faith-based societies such as the Christian Union and Hindu Society.

== University technical colleges ==
The university is an academic sponsor of two university technical colleges which opened in September 2013. Daventry University Technical College specialises in engineering, construction and environmental sustainability, Silverstone University Technical College in motorsports engineering, event management and hospitality.

== Notable people ==
=== Staff ===
- Henry Bird, taught drawing at the art school; his students included the architect Will Alsop
- Dave Hill, political and educational activist, professor of education (2007–12)
- Robert Kirk, professor emeritus in the department of philosophy

=== Alumni ===
- Will Alsop, modernist architect; graduated from Northampton College of Art
- Jon Bewers, footballer
- James D. Boys, academic and media consultant
- Dallas Campbell, television presenter and stage actor
- Andrew Collins, writer and broadcaster
- James Densley, academic and author
- Bill Drummond, artist, musician, writer and record producer
- Felippe Moraes, visual artist, art researcher and independent curator
- Daniel Middleton (aka DanTDM), YouTuber and writer
- Owen Paterson, Secretary of State for Environment, Food and Rural Affairs (2012–2014); graduated from Leathersellers College
- Lisa Davina Phillip, actress and singer
- Denys Watkins-Pitchford, prolific author of children's books and of rural affairs; illustrator and artist; graduated from Northampton College of Art
- Sang Heon Lee, South Korean actor
- Toby Cadman, international human rights lawyer and special adviser to the chief prosecutor of ICT

== See also ==
- Armorial of UK universities
- College of Education
- List of universities in the UK
- Northamptonshire Credit Union
- University of Northampton (13th century)
