= Mike Jackson (film producer) =

American film producer

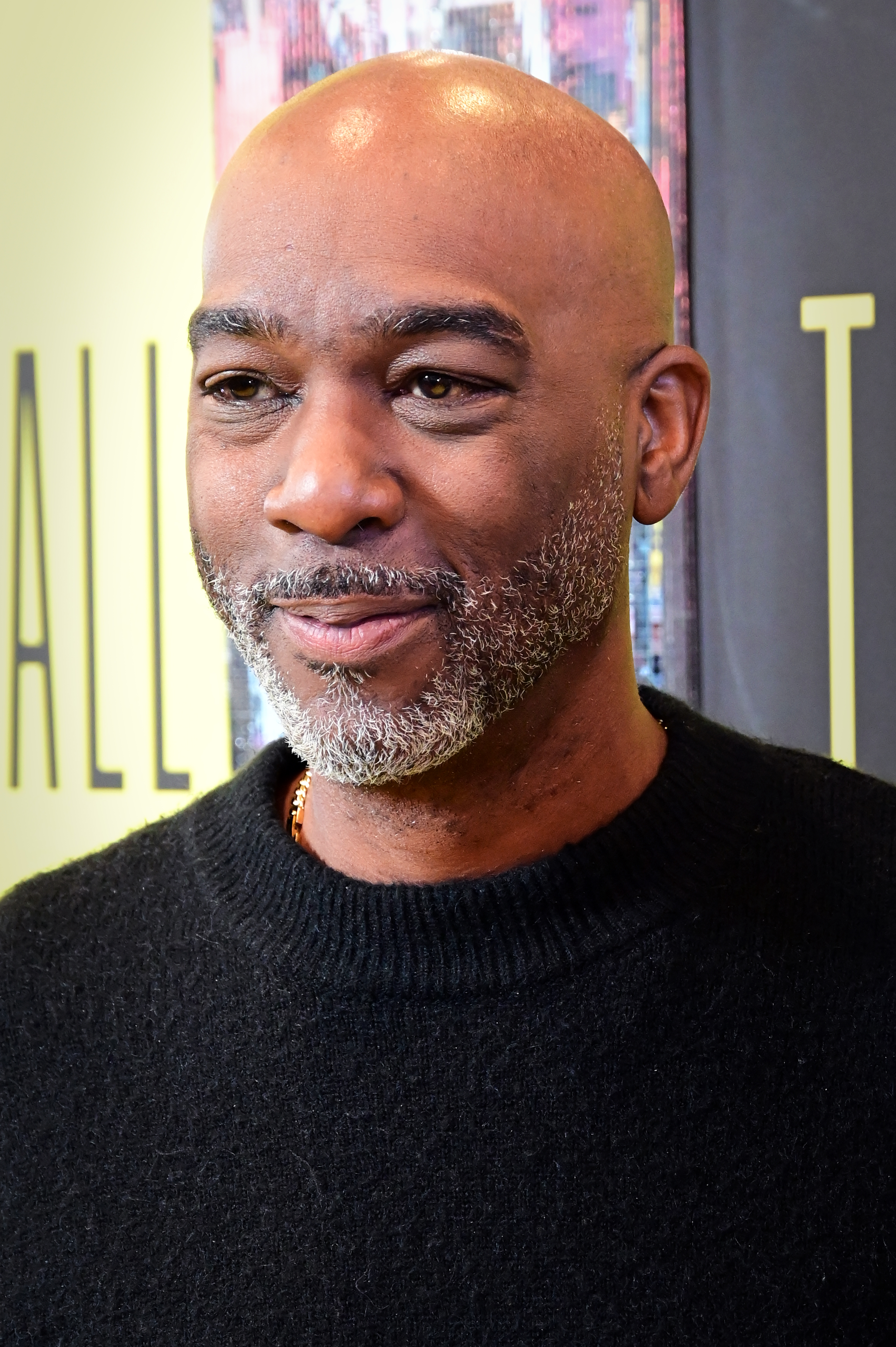
- Jackson in 2026
- Occupations: Film producer, talent manager

Mike Jackson is an American entrepreneur, producer, film and television studio executive. Jackson founded Get Lifted Film Co. with John Legend and Ty Stiklorius.

== Career ==
Under GLFC, Jackson has Executive Producer credits on NBC's Emmy-winning Jesus Christ Superstar; Lionsgate's Oscar-nominated film, La La Land, written and directed by Damien Chazelle; and the drama series, Underground on WGN.
