= 1993–94 Aston Villa F.C. season =

English football club season

Aston Villa F.C.
1993–94 season
- Chairman: Doug Ellis
- Manager: Ron Atkinson
- Stadium: Villa Park
- Premier League: 10th
- FA Cup: Fifth round
- League Cup: Winners
- UEFA Cup: Second round
- Top goalscorer: League: Dean Saunders (9 goals); All: Dalian Atkinson; Dean Saunders (15 each)
- Highest home attendance: 45,347 vs. Liverpool (7 May 1994, Premier League)
- Lowest home attendance: 16,180 vs. Southampton (24 Nov 1993, Premier League)
- Average home league attendance: 29,065
Home colours	Away colours

Second City Derby
- 46--32--26

The 1993–94 English football season was Aston Villa's 2nd season in the Premier League and 7th season in Europe. It was Aston Villa's 119th professional season, their 83rd season in the top flight and their 6th consecutive season in the top tier of English football. The Kit Supplier was Asics and the shirt sponsors were Müller.

Aston Villa were never anywhere near the title race that they had looked likely to win for much of the previous season, as they finished 10th in the table a year after coming second. The slump was largely due to a shortage of goals. But their compensation for this shortcoming was victory in the League Cup final against Manchester United - a 3–1 scoreline ending the opposition's hope of becoming the first English team to win all three major domestic trophies in the same season.

Villa were drawn against Birmingham City in the League Cup second round. The Second City derby would be the only one in a 14-year period from the 1988–89 season, when Viila won all three matches 13–0 in aggregate, until 2002–03 season

There were debuts for Andy Townsend (134), Graham Fenton (30) and Guy Whittingham (25).

== Premier League ==
Pos	Team	Pld	W	D	L	GF	GA	GD	Pts	Qualification or relegation
8	Liverpool	42	17	9	16	59	55	+4	60	
9	Queens Park Rangers	42	16	12	14	62	61	+1	60	
10	Aston Villa	42	15	12	15	46	50	−4	57	Qualification for the UEFA Cup first round (Note: Aston Villa qualified for the UEFA Cup as League Cup winners.)
11	Coventry City	42	14	14	14	43	45	−2	56	
12	Norwich City	42	12	17	13	65	61	+4	53	

Source: Premier League
Rules for classification: 1) points; 2) goal difference; 3) number of goals scored.

=== Results by round ===
Round	1	2	3	4	5	6	7	8	9	10	11	12	13	14	15	16	17	18	19	20	21	22	23	24	25	26	27	28	29	30	31	32	33	34	35	36	37	38	39	40	41	42
Venue	H	A	A	H	H	A	H	A	A	H	A	H	A	A	H	H	A	A	H	H	A	A	H	H	A	H	H	H	A	A	H	A	H	H	A	H	A	A	H	A	A	H
Result	W	D	D	L	W	W	D	W	D	L	D	W	W	W	W	L	L	D	D	L	L	W	L	W	D	W	W	D	D	W	L	L	L	D	L	D	L	W	L	L	L	W
Position	1	6	10	11	10	6	6	3	3	8	7	7	5	3	2	3	5	6	6	8	9	8	10	9	10	8	6	6	7	5	7	7	7	8	10	10	10	9	10	10	10	10

Source: Premier League
A = Away; H = Home; W = Win; D = Draw; L = Loss; P = Postponed

=== Matches ===
14 August 1993 1	Aston Villa	4–1	Queens Park Rangers	Birmingham
15:00	Atkinson 38' 90'; Saunders 61'; Staunton 90'	Report	Ferdinand 44'	Stadium: Villa Park; Attendance: 32,994; Referee: Kelvin Morton

18 August 1993 2	Sheffield Wednesday	0-0	Aston Villa	Sheffield
19:45		Report		Stadium: Hillsborough; Attendance: 28,450; Referee: Peter Foakes

21 August 1993 3	Wimbledon	2-2	Aston Villa	London
15:00	Holdsworth 38'; Fashanu 85'	Report	Richardson 17'; Staunton 82'	Stadium: Selhurst Park; Attendance: 7,122; Referee: Jim Borrett

23 August 1993 4	Aston Villa	1–2	Manchester United	Birmingham
20:00	Atkinson 44'	Report	Sharpe 17' 74'	Stadium: Villa Park; Attendance: 39,624; Referee: David Elleray

28 August 1993 5	Aston Villa	1-0	Tottenham Hotspur	Birmingham
15:00	Staunton 71' (pen.)	Report		Stadium: Villa Park; Attendance: 32,498; Referee: Keith Cooper

31 August 1993 6	Everton	0-1	Aston Villa	Liverpool
19:30		Report	Whittingham 32'	Stadium: Goodison Park; Attendance: 24,022; Referee: Alan Gunn

11 September 1993 7	Aston Villa	0-0	Coventry City	Birmingham
15:00		Report		Stadium: Villa Park; Attendance: 31,181; Referee: Martin Bodenham

18 September 1993 8	Ipswich Town	1-2	Aston Villa	Ipswich
15:00	Marshall 9'	Report	Saunders 19'; Townsend 55'	Stadium: Portman Road; Attendance: 16,617; Referee: Roger Dilkes

25 September 1993 9	Oldham Athletic	1-1	Aston Villa	Oldham
15:00	Halle 14'	Report	Saunders 51'	Stadium: Boundary Park; Attendance: 12,836; Referee: Howard King

2 October 1993 10	Aston Villa	0-2	Newcastle United	Birmingham
15:00		Report	Allen 46' (pen.); Cole 80'	Stadium: Villa Park; Attendance: 37,336; Referee: Paul Durkin

16 October 1993 11	West Ham United	0-0	Aston Villa	London
15:00		Report		Stadium: Boleyn Ground; Attendance: 20,425; Referee: Stephen Lodge

23 October 1993 12	Aston Villa	1-0	Chelsea	Birmingham
15:00	Atkinson 6'	Report		Stadium: Villa Park; Attendance: 29,706; Referee: David Allison

30 October 1993 13	Swindon Town	1-2	Aston Villa	Swindon
15:00	Bodin 33' (pen.)	Report	Teale 43'; Atkinson 68'	Stadium: County Ground; Attendance: 16,530; Referee: Keith Burge

6 November 1993 14	Arsenal	1-2	Aston Villa	London
15:00	Wright 58'	Report	Whittingham 74'; Townsend 90'	Stadium: Highbury; Attendance: 31,773; Referee: Martin Bodenham

20 November 1993 15	Aston Villa	1-0	Sheffield United	Birmingham
15:00	Whittingham 76'	Report		Stadium: Villa Park; Attendance: 24,686; Referee: David Frampton

24 November 1993 16	Aston Villa	0-2	Southampton	Birmingham
19:45		Report	Le Tissier 50' 62'	Stadium: Villa Park; Attendance: 16,180; Referee: Kelvin Morton

28 November 1993 17	Liverpool	2-1	Aston Villa	Liverpool
16:00	Fowler 45'; Redknapp 62'	Report	Atkinson 53'	Stadium: Anfield; Attendance: 38,484; Referee: Alan Wilkie

4 December 1993 18	Queens Park Rangers	2-2	Aston Villa	London
15:00	McGrath 5' (o.g.); Penrice 40'	Report	Richardson 47'; Parker 47'	Stadium: Loftus Road; Attendance: 14,915; Referee: Keith Hackett

8 December 1993 19	Aston Villa	2-2	Sheffield Wednesday	Birmingham
19:45	Cox 29'; Saunders 53' (pen.)	Report	Bart-Williams 24'; Teale 69' (o.g.)	Stadium: Villa Park; Attendance: 20,304; Referee: Peter Foakes

11 December 1993 20	Aston Villa	0-1	Wimbledon	Birmingham
15:00		Report	Holdsworth 77'	Stadium: Villa Park; Attendance: 17,940; Referee: Alan Gunn

19 December 1993 21	Manchester United	3-1	Aston Villa	Greater Manchester
16:00	Cantona 21' 89'; Ince 90'	Report	Cox 90'	Stadium: Old Trafford; Attendance: 44,499; Referee: Joe Worrall

29 December 1993 22	Norwich City	1-2	Aston Villa	Norwich
19:45	Sutton 26'	Report	Houghton 55'; Saunders 58'	Stadium: Carrow Road; Attendance: 20,650; Referee: David Elleray

1 January 1994 23	Aston Villa	0-1	Blackburn Rovers	Birmingham
15:00		Report	Shearer 38'	Stadium: Villa Park; Attendance: 40,903; Referee: Roger Dilkes

15 January 1994 24	Aston Villa	3-1	West Ham United	Birmingham
15:00	Richardson 15'; Atkinson 43' 68'	Report	Allen 30'	Stadium: Villa Park; Attendance: 28,869; Referee: Stephen Lodge

22 January 1994 25	Chelsea	1-1	Aston Villa	London
15:00	[[Toggle the table of contents Mark Stein (footballer)|Stein]] 67'	Report	Saunders 39'	Stadium: Stamford Bridge; Attendance: 18,341; Referee: Graham Poll

6 February 1994 26	Aston Villa	1-0	Leeds United	Birmingham
16:00	Townsend 70'	Report		Stadium: Villa Park; Attendance: 26,919; Referee: Jim Borrett

12 February 1994 27	Aston Villa	5-0	Swindon Town	Birmingham
15:00	Saunders 31' 66' (pen.) 84' (pen.); Froggat 55'; Richardson 73'	Report		Stadium: Villa Park; Attendance: 27,637; Referee: Robbie Hart

22 February 1994 28	Aston Villa	0-0	Manchester City	Birmingham
19:45		Report		Stadium: Villa Park; Attendance: 19,254; Referee: Martin Bodenham

2 March 1994 29	Tottenham Hotspur	1-1	Aston Villa	London
19:45	Rosenthal 74'	Report	Parker 9'	Stadium: White Hart Lane; Attendance: 17,452; Referee: Kelvin Morton

6 March 1994 30	Coventry City	0-1	Aston Villa	Coventry
16:00		Report	Daley 20'	Stadium: Highfield Road; Attendance: 14,235; Referee: Martin Bodenham

12 March 1994 31	Aston Villa	0-1	Ipswich Town	Birmingham
15:00		Report	Johnson 8'	Stadium: Villa Park; Attendance: 23,732; Referee: Alan Wilkie

16 March 1994 32	Leeds United	2-0	Aston Villa	Leeds
19:45	Wallace 27'; Deane 52'	Report		Stadium: Elland Road; Attendance: 33,120; Referee: David Allison

19 March 1994 33	Aston Villa	1-2	Oldham Athletic	Birmingham
15:00	Redmond 57' (o.g.)	Report	Beckford 67'; Holden 74'	Stadium: Villa Park; Attendance: 21,214; Referee: Joe Worrall

30 March 1994 34	Aston Villa	0-0	Everton	Birmingham
19:45		Report		Stadium: Villa Park; Attendance: 36,044; Referee: Rodger Gifford

2 April 1994 35	Manchester City	3-0	Aston Villa	Manchester
15:00	Beagrie 39'; Walsh 45'; Rösler 53'	Report		Stadium: Maine Road; Attendance: 26,075; Referee: Paul Durkin

4 April 1994 36	Aston Villa	0-0	Norwich City	Birmingham
15:00		Report		Stadium: Villa Park; Attendance: 25,416; Referee: Martin Bodenham

11 April 1994 37	Blackburn Rovers	1-0	Aston Villa	Blackburn
20:00	Shearer 10'	Report		Stadium: Ewood Park; Attendance: 19,287; Referee: David Allison

16 April 1994 38	Sheffield United	1-2	Aston Villa	Sheffield
15:00	Littlejohn 17'	Report	Richardson 23'; Fenton 25'	Stadium: Bramall Lane; Attendance: 18,402; Referee: Graham Poll

23 April 1994 39	Aston Villa	1-2	Arsenal	Birmingham
15:00	Houghton 57'	Report	Wright 30' (pen.) 90'	Stadium: Villa Park; Attendance: 32,590; Referee: Keith Cooper

27 April 1994 40	Newcastle United	5-1	Aston Villa	Newcastle upon Tyne
19:45	Bracewell 15'; Beardsley 23' (pen.) 66'; Cole 41'; Sellars 79'	Report	Beinlich 10'	Stadium: St. James' Park; Attendance: 32,216; Referee: John Lloyd

30 April 1994 41	Southampton	4-1	Aston Villa	Southampton
15:00	Le Tissier 19' 77'; Monkou 39'; Maddison 89'	Report	Saunders 58'	Stadium: The Dell; Attendance: 19,003; Referee: Stephen Lodge

7 May 1994 42	Aston Villa	2-1	Liverpool	Birmingham
15:00	Yorke 65' 81'	Report	Fowler 17'	Stadium: Villa Park; Attendance: 45,347; Referee: Keith Burge

== FA Cup ==
8 January 1994 R3	Exeter City	0-1	Aston Villa	Exeter
15:00			Saunders 60' (pen.)	Stadium: St. James Park; Attendance: 10,570; Referee: Keith Cooper

29 January 1994 R4	Grimsby Town	1-2	Aston Villa	Grimsby
15:00	Groves 60'		Houghton 13'; Yorke 78'	Stadium: Blundell Park; Attendance: 15,771; Referee: Ian Hemley

23 February 1993 R5	Bolton Wanderers	1-0	Aston Villa	Bolton
15:00	Stubbs 82'			Stadium: Burnden Park; Attendance: 18,817; Referee: Brian Hill

== League Cup ==
21 September 1993 R2 L1	Birmingham City	0-1	Aston Villa	Birmingham
19:45			Richardson 82'	Stadium: St. Andrew's; Attendance: 27,815; Referee: Keren Barratt

6 October 1993 R2 L2	Aston Villa	1-0 (2-0 agg.)	Birmingham City	Birmingham
19:45	Saunders 82'			Stadium: Villa Park; Attendance: 35,856; Referee: Gerald Ashby

26 October 1993 R3	Sunderland	1-4	Aston Villa	Sunderland
19:45	Gray 47'		Atkinson 27' 90'; Richardson 33'; Houghton 75'	Stadium: Roker Park; Attendance: 23,692; Referee: Alan Flood

30 November 1993 R4	Arsenal	0-1	Aston Villa	London
19:45			Atkinson 4'	Stadium: Highbury; Attendance: 26,453; Referee: Roger Gifford

12 January 1994 QF	Tottenham Hotspur	1-2	Aston Villa	Birmingham
19:45	Caskey 63'		Houghton 56'; Barrett 68'	Stadium: Villa Park; Attendance: 31,408; Referee: Terry Holbrook

16 February 1994 SF L1	Tranmere Rovers	3-1	Aston Villa	Birkenhead
19:45	Nolan 5'; Hughes 24'; Aldridge 78'		Atkinson 90'	Stadium: Prenton Park; Attendance: 17,140; Referee: Roger Milford

27 February 1994 SF L2	Aston Villa	3-1 (a.e.t.) (4-4 agg.) (5-4 p)	Tranmere Rovers	Birmingham
19:45	Saunders 19'; Teale 24'; Atkinson 88'		Aldridge 27' (pen.)	Stadium: Villa Park; Attendance: 40,593; Referee: Allan Gunn
	Penalties
	Saunders (penalty scored); Teale (penalty scored); Fenton (penalty scored); Atkinson (penalty scored); Ehiogu (penalty missed); Richardson (penalty missed); Daley (penalty scored)		(penalty scored) Irons; (penalty scored) Thomas; (penalty missed) Brannan; (penalty scored) Higgins; (penalty scored) Aldridge; (penalty missed) O'Brien; (penalty missed) Nolan

27 March 1994 FINAL	Aston Villa	3-1	Manchester United	London
17:00	Atkinson 25'; Saunders 75' 90' (pen.)	1994 Football League Cup final	Hughes 82'	Stadium: Wembley; Attendance: 77,231; Referee: Keith Cooper

== UEFA Cup ==
15 September 1993 R1 L1	Slovan Bratislava (Czechoslovakia)	0-0	(England) Aston Villa	Bratislava
15:45				Stadium: Tehelné pole Attendance: 10,886; Referee: Marcello Nicchi

29 September 1993 R1 L2	Aston Villa (England)	2-1 (2-1 agg.)	(Czechoslovakia) Slovan Bratislava	Birmingham
19:45	Atkinson 15'; Townsend 22'		Dušan Tittel 86'	Stadium: Villa Park; Attendance: 24,461; Referee: Peter Mikkelsen

19 October 1993 R2 L1	Deportivo La Coruña (Spain)	1-1	(England) Aston Villa	A Coruña
19:45	Riesco 87'		Saunders 78'	Stadium: Estadio Riazor; Attendance: 26,800; Referee: Marc Batta

3 November 1993 R2 L2	Aston Villa (England)	0-1 (1-2 agg.)	(Spain) Deportivo La Coruña	Birmingham
19:45			Manjarín 36'	Stadium: Villa Park; Attendance: 26,737; Referee: Hans-Jürgen Weber

== Players ==
The likes of Dean Saunders and Paul McGrath were as consistent and reliable as ever, though a few older players such as Garry Parker, Kevin Richardson and Shaun Teale were starting to look past their best.

The pre-season signing of 30-year-old midfielder Andy Townsend from Chelsea was one of the best pieces of business done so far by manager Ron Atkinson, whereas the capture of Guy Whittingham from Portsmouth proved to be a disappointment - the striker never came anywhere near matching the tally of 47 goals he had scored done for the south coast club a season earlier, and he was loaned out to Wolverhampton to gain more first-team chances. Gordon Cowans rejoined the club for his third spell but left the club again after just a few months.

Villa fans were given something to look forward to with the emergence of promising young players like Ugo Ehiogu, Graham Fenton and Mark Bosnich.

#	Pos	Name	Nat	Place of birth	Date of birth (age)	Signed from	Date signed	Fee	Apps	Gls
Goalkeepers
1	GK	Nigel Spink	(England)	Chelmsford	8 August 1958 (aged 34)	Chelmsford City	4 January 1977	£4,000	414	0
13	GK	Mark Bosnich	(Australia)	Liverpool	13 January 1972 (aged 21)	Sydney Croatia	28 February 1992	Free transfer	19	0
30	GK	Michael Oakes	(England)	Northwich	30 October 1973 (aged 19)	Academy	1 July 1991	—N/a	0	0
Defenders
2	RB	Earl Barrett	(England)	Rochdale	28 April 1967 (aged 26)	Oldham Athletic	25 February 1992	£1,700,000	64	1
3	LB	Steve Staunton	(Republic of Ireland)	Dundalk	19 January 1969 (aged 24)	Liverpool	7 August 1991	£1,100,000	94	6
4	CB	Shaun Teale	(England)	Southport	10 March 1964 (aged 29)	Bournemouth	25 July 1991	£300,000	96	3
5	CB	Paul McGrath	(Republic of Ireland)	Greenford	4 December 1959 (aged 33)	Manchester United	3 August 1989	£400,000	175	7
16	CB	Ugo Ehiogu	(England)	Hackney	3 November 1972 (aged 20)	West Bromwich Albion	12 July 1991	£40,000	14	0
17	CB	Neil Cox	(England)	Scunthorpe	8 October 1971 (aged 21)	Scunthorpe United	12 February 1991	£400,000	27	2
23	LB	Bryan Small	(England)	Birmingham	15 November 1971 (aged 21)	Academy	1 July 1990	—N/a	26	0
24	RB	Dariusz Kubicki	(Poland)	Kożuchów	6 June 1963 (aged 30)	Legia Warsaw	28 August 1991	£200,000	30	0
Midfielders
6	CM	Kevin Richardson (c)	(England)	Newcastle upon Tyne	4 December 1962 (aged 30)	Real Sociedad	6 August 1991	£450,000	100	3
7	CM	Ray Houghton	(Republic of Ireland)	Glasgow	9 January 1962 (aged 31)	Liverpool	28 July 1992	£900,000	46	4
8	CM	Garry Parker	(England)	Oxford	7 September 1965 (aged 27)	Nottingham Forest	29 November 1991	£650,000	76	11
14	CM	Andy Townsend	(Republic of Ireland)	Maidstone	26 July 1963 (aged 29)	Chelsea	26 July 1993	£2,100,000	-	-
15	CM	Gordon Cowans	(England)	West Cornforth	27 October 1958 (aged 34)	Blackburn Rovers	5 July 1993	Free transfer	510	59
19	AM	Stefan Beinlich	(Germany)	East Berlin	13 January 1972 (aged 21)	Bergmann-Borsig	1 October 1991	£100,000	9	0
20	AM	Matthias Breitkreutz	(Germany)	Crivitz	12 May 1971 (aged 22)	Bergmann-Borsig	1 October 1991	£100,000	12	0
21	CM	David Farrell	(England)	Birmingham	11 November 1971 (aged 21)	Redditch United	6 January 1992	£45,000	0	0
25	AM	Graham Fenton	(England)	Whitley Bay	22 May 1974 (aged 19)	Academy	1 July 1993	—N/a	-	-
Forwards
9	CF	Dean Saunders	(Wales)	Swansea	21 June 1964 (aged 29)	Liverpool	10 September 1992	£2,300,000	44	17
10	CF	Dalian Atkinson	(England)	Shrewsbury	21 March 1968 (aged 25)	Real Sociedad	11 July 1991	£1,600,000	48	14
11	RW	Tony Daley	(England)	Birmingham	18 October 1967 (aged 25)	Academy	1 January 1986	—N/a	237	34
12	LW	Steve Froggatt	(England)	Lincoln	5 March 1973 (aged 20)	Academy	1 July 1991	—N/a	37	2
18	CF	Dwight Yorke	(Trinidad and Tobago)	Canaan	3 November 1971 (aged 21)	Signal Hill	19 December 1989	£120,000	89	26
22	CF	Guy Whittingham	(England)	Evesham	10 November 1964 (aged 28)	Portsmouth	3 August 1993	£1,300,000	-	-

Note: Stats and ages are correct as of July 1, 1993.

=== Transfers ===
Transferred in

Date	Pos	Player	From	Fee
5 July 1993	CM	Gordon Cowans	Blackburn Rovers	Free transfer
26 July 1993	CM	Andy Townsend	Chelsea	£2,100,000
3 August 1993	CF	Guy Whittingham	Portsmouth	1,200,000
				£3,300,000

Loaned in

Date	Pos	Player	From	Loan End

Transferred out

Date	Pos	Player	To	Fee
5 July 1993	CF	Martin Carruthers	Stoke City	£300,000
3 August 1993	CF	Cyrille Regis	Wolverhampton Wanderers	Free transfer
5 August 1993	CM	Mark Blake	Portsmouth	£400,000
26 February 1994	CM	Gordon Cowans	Derby County	£80,000
				£780,000

Loaned out

Date	Pos	Player	To	Loan End
15 October 1993	CB	Chris Boden	Barnsley	15 January 1994
26 November 1993	GK	Michael Oakes	Scarborough Athletic	26 December 1993
10 January 1994	AM	Graham Fenton	West Bromwich Albion	10 February 1994
28 February 1994	CF	Guy Whittingham	Wolverhampton Wanderers	31 May 1994
4 March 1994	RB	Dariusz Kubicki	Sunderland	31 May 1994

Overall transfer activity

Expenditure ▼£3,300,000

Income ▲£780,000

'Balance ' ▼£2,520,000

=== Total ===
#	Pos	Nat	Player	Sqd	App	FXI	Sub	Unu	Gls	Ast	O.G.	C.S.	Yellow card	(yellow card) (yellow-red card)	Red card	Substituted on	Substituted off	
1	GK	(England)	Nigel Spink	40	15	14	1	25	-	-	-	4	-	-	1	1	-	1288'
13	GK	(Australia)	Mark Bosnich	36	28	27	-	8	-	-	-	9	1	-	-	-	1	2481'
30	GK	(England)	Michael Oakes	8	-	-	-	8	-	-	-	-	-	-	-	-	-	-
2	RB	(England)	Earl Barrett	39	39	39	-	-	-	-	-	-	2	-	-	-	-	3510'
3	LB	(Republic of Ireland)	Steve Staunton	24	24	24	-	-	3	1	-	-	2	-	-	-	4	2093'
4	CB	(England)	Shaun Teale	38	37	37	1	-	1	-	1	-	5	-	-	1	1	3310'
5	CB	(Republic of Ireland)	Paul McGrath	30	30	30	-	-	-	1	1	-	2	-	-	-	2	2645'
16	CB	(England)	Ugo Ehiogu	23	17	14	3	6	-	-	-	-	1	-	-	3	-	1277'
17	CB	(England)	Neil Cox	31	20	16	4	11	2	1	-	-	2	-	-	4	1	1489'
23	LB	(England)	Bryan Small	10	9	8	1	1	-	-	-	-	-	-	-	1	3	703'
24	RB	(Poland)	Dariusz Kubicki	2	2	1	1	-	-	-	-	-	-	-	-	1	1	69'
6	CM	(England)	Kevin Richardson	40	40	40	-	-	5	5	-	-	1	-	-	-	2	3588'
7	CM	(Republic of Ireland)	Ray Houghton	30	30	25	5	-	2	3	-	-	-	-	-	5	4	2288'
8	CM	(England)	Garry Parker	21	19	17	2	2	2	2	-	-	1	-	-	2	2	1532'
14	CM	(Republic of Ireland)	Andy Townsend	32	32	32	-	-	3	6	-	-	3	-	-	-	5	2706'
15	CM	(England)	Gordon Cowans	12	11	9	2	1	-	-	-	-	-	-	-	2	1	878'
19	AM	(Germany)	Stefan Beinlich	9	7	6	1	2	1	1	-	-	-	-	-	1	1	531'
20	AM	(Germany)	Matthias Breitkreutz	2	2	1	1	-	-	-	-	-	-	-	-	1	1	91'
21	CM	(England)	David Farrell	5	4	4	-	1	-	-	-	-	-	-	-	-	3	300'
25	AM	(England)	Graham Fenton	12	9	8	1	-	1	-	-	-	1	-	-	3	1	842'
9	CF	(Wales)	Dean Saunders	39	38	37	1	1	10	3	-	-	-	-	-	1	4	3259'
10	CF	(England)	Dalian Atkinson	29	29	29	-	-	8	5	-	-	1	-	-	-	3	2546'
11	RW	(England)	Tony Daley	27	27	19	8	-	1	3	-	-	-	-	-	8	2	1884'
12	LW	(England)	Steve Froggatt	9	9	8	1	-	1	-	-	-	-	-	-	1	-	732'
18	CF	(Trinidad and Tobago)	Dwight Yorke	15	12	2	10	3	2	-	-	-	-	-	-	10	1	421'
22	CF	(England)	Guy Whittingham	25	18	13	5	7	3	-	-	-	1	-	-	5	7	1106'

=== Premier League ===
#	Pos	Nat	Player	Sqd	App	FXI	Sub	Unu	Gls	Ast	O.G.	C.S.	Yellow card	(yellow card) (yellow-red card)	Red card	Substituted on	Substituted off	
1	GK	(England)	Nigel Spink	40	15	14	1	25	-	-	-	4	-	-	1	1	-	1288'
13	GK	(Australia)	Mark Bosnich	36	28	27	-	8	-	-	-	9	1	-	-	-	1	2481'
30	GK	(England)	Michael Oakes	8	-	-	-	8	-	-	-	-	-	-	-	-	-	-
2	RB	(England)	Earl Barrett	39	39	39	-	-	-	-	-	-	2	-	-	-	-	3510'
3	LB	(Republic of Ireland)	Steve Staunton	24	24	24	-	-	3	1	-	-	2	-	-	-	4	2093'
4	CB	(England)	Shaun Teale	38	37	37	1	-	1	-	1	-	5	-	-	1	1	3310'
5	CB	(Republic of Ireland)	Paul McGrath	30	30	30	-	-	-	1	1	-	2	-	-	-	2	2645'
16	CB	(England)	Ugo Ehiogu	23	17	14	3	6	-	-	-	-	1	-	-	3	-	1277'
17	CB	(England)	Neil Cox	31	20	16	4	11	2	1	-	-	2	-	-	4	1	1489'
23	LB	(England)	Bryan Small	10	9	8	1	1	-	-	-	-	-	-	-	1	3	703'
24	RB	(Poland)	Dariusz Kubicki	2	2	1	1	-	-	-	-	-	-	-	-	1	1	69'
6	CM	(England)	Kevin Richardson	40	40	40	-	-	5	5	-	-	1	-	-	-	2	3588'
7	CM	(Republic of Ireland)	Ray Houghton	30	30	25	5	-	2	3	-	-	-	-	-	5	4	2288'
8	CM	(England)	Garry Parker	21	19	17	2	2	2	2	-	-	1	-	-	2	2	1532'
14	CM	(Republic of Ireland)	Andy Townsend	32	32	32	-	-	3	6	-	-	3	-	-	-	5	2706'
15	CM	(England)	Gordon Cowans	12	11	9	2	1	-	-	-	-	-	-	-	2	1	878'
19	AM	(Germany)	Stefan Beinlich	9	7	6	1	2	1	1	-	-	-	-	-	1	1	531'
20	AM	(Germany)	Matthias Breitkreutz	2	2	1	1	-	-	-	-	-	-	-	-	1	1	91'
21	CM	(England)	David Farrell	5	4	4	-	1	-	-	-	-	-	-	-	-	3	300'
25	AM	(England)	Graham Fenton	12	9	8	1	-	1	-	-	-	1	-	-	3	1	842'
9	CF	(Wales)	Dean Saunders	39	38	37	1	1	10	3	-	-	-	-	-	1	4	3259'
10	CF	(England)	Dalian Atkinson	29	29	29	-	-	8	5	-	-	1	-	-	-	3	2546'
11	RW	(England)	Tony Daley	27	27	19	8	-	1	3	-	-	-	-	-	8	2	1884'
12	LW	(England)	Steve Froggatt	9	9	8	1	-	1	-	-	-	-	-	-	1	-	732'
18	CF	(Trinidad and Tobago)	Dwight Yorke	15	12	2	10	3	2	-	-	-	-	-	-	10	1	421'
22	CF	(England)	Guy Whittingham	25	18	13	5	7	3	-	-	-	1	-	-	5	7	1106'

=== FA Cup ===
#	Pos	Nat	Player	Sqd	App	FXI	Sub	Unu	Gls	Ast	O.G.	C.S.	Yellow card	(yellow card) (yellow-red card)	Red card	Substituted on	Substituted off	
1	GK	(England)	Nigel Spink	3	-	-	-	3	-	-	-	-	-	-	-	-	-	-
13	GK	(Australia)	Mark Bosnich	3	3	3	-	-	-	-	-	1	-	-	-	-	-	270'
30	GK	(England)	Michael Oakes	-	-	-	-	-	-	-	-	-	-	-	-	-	-	-
2	RB	(England)	Earl Barrett	3	3	3	-	-	-	-	-	-	-	-	-	-	-	270'
3	LB	(Republic of Ireland)	Steve Staunton	2	2	2	-	-	-	-	-	-	-	-	-	-	-	180'
4	CB	(England)	Shaun Teale	2	2	2	-	-	-	-	-	-	-	-	1	-	-	113'
5	CB	(Republic of Ireland)	Paul McGrath	2	2	2	-	-	-	-	-	-	-	-	-	-	-	180'
16	CB	(England)	Ugo Ehiogu	1	1	-	1	-	-	-	-	-	-	-	-	1	-	45'
17	CB	(England)	Neil Cox	3	3	2	1	-	-	-	-	-	-	-	-	1	-	246'
23	LB	(England)	Bryan Small	1	-	-	-	1	-	-	-	-	-	-	-	-	-	-
24	RB	(Poland)	Dariusz Kubicki	-	-	-	-	-	-	-	-	-	-	-	-	-	-	-
6	CM	(England)	Kevin Richardson	3	3	3	-	-	-	-	-	-	-	-	-	-	-	270'
7	CM	(Republic of Ireland)	Ray Houghton	3	3	3	-	-	1	-	-	-	-	-	-	-	-	270'
8	CM	(England)	Garry Parker	1	1	1	-	-	-	-	-	-	-	-	-	-	-	90'
14	CM	(Republic of Ireland)	Andy Townsend	3	3	3	-	-	-	-	-	-	-	-	-	-	-	270'
15	CM	(England)	Gordon Cowans	-	-	-	-	-	-	-	-	-	-	-	-	-	-	-
19	AM	(Germany)	Stefan Beinlich	-	-	-	-	-	-	-	-	-	-	-	-	-	-	-
20	AM	(Germany)	Matthias Breitkreutz	-	-	-	-	-	-	-	-	-	-	-	-	-	-	-
21	CM	(England)	David Farrell	-	-	-	-	-	-	-	-	-	-	-	-	-	-	-
25	AM	(England)	Graham Fenton	-	-	-	-	-	-	-	-	-	-	-	-	-	-	-
9	CF	(Wales)	Dean Saunders	3	3	3	-	-	1	-	-	-	-	-	-	-	1	215'
10	CF	(England)	Dalian Atkinson	3	3	3	-	-	-	1	-	-	-	-	-	-	1	256'
11	RW	(England)	Tony Daley	2	2	2	-	-	-	-	-	-	-	-	-	-	2	69'
12	LW	(England)	Steve Froggatt	1	1	1	-	-	-	-	-	-	-	-	-	-	-	90'
18	CF	(Trinidad and Tobago)	Dwight Yorke	2	2	1	1	-	1	-	-	-	-	-	-	1	-	145'
22	CF	(England)	Guy Whittingham	1	-	-	-	1	-	-	-	-	-	-	-	-	-	-

=== League Cup ===
#	Pos	Nat	Player	Sqd	App	FXI	Sub	Unu	Gls	Ast	O.G.	C.S.	Yellow card	(yellow card) (yellow-red card)	Red card	Substituted on	Substituted off	
1	GK	(England)	Nigel Spink	8	1	1	-	7	-	-	-	-	-	-	-	-	1	30'
13	GK	(Australia)	Mark Bosnich	8	8	7	1	-	-	-	-	3	-	-	-	1	-	720'
30	GK	(England)	Michael Oakes	-	-	-	-	-	-	-	-	-	-	-	-	-	-	-
2	RB	(England)	Earl Barrett	7	7	7	-	-	1	-	-	-	-	-	-	-	-	660'
3	LB	(Republic of Ireland)	Steve Staunton	5	5	5	-	-	-	-	-	-	-	-	-	-	2	424'
4	CB	(England)	Shaun Teale	7	7	7	-	-	1	-	-	-	-	-	-	-	-	660'
5	CB	(Republic of Ireland)	Paul McGrath	8	8	8	-	-	-	-	-	-	1	-	-	-	-	750'
16	CB	(England)	Ugo Ehiogu	3	1	-	1	2	-	-	-	-	-	-	-	1	-	30'
17	CB	(England)	Neil Cox	6	5	4	1	1	-	-	-	-	-	-	-	1	1	357'
23	LB	(England)	Bryan Small	1	1	1	-	-	-	-	-	-	-	-	-	-	-	90'
24	RB	(Poland)	Dariusz Kubicki	-	-	-	-	-	-	-	-	-	-	-	-	-	-	-
6	CM	(England)	Kevin Richardson	8	8	8	-	-	2	2	-	-	1	-	-	-	-	750'
7	CM	(Republic of Ireland)	Ray Houghton	8	6	4	2	2	2	-	-	-	-	-	-	2	1	441'
8	CM	(England)	Garry Parker	4	3	3	-	1	-	1	-	-	-	-	-	-	-	270'
14	CM	(Republic of Ireland)	Andy Townsend	8	8	8	-	-	-	1	-	-	-	-	-	-	1	705'
15	CM	(England)	Gordon Cowans	2	2	2	-	-	-	-	-	-	-	-	-	-	-	180'
19	AM	(Germany)	Stefan Beinlich	-	-	-	-	-	-	-	-	-	-	-	-	-	-	-
20	AM	(Germany)	Matthias Breitkreutz	-	-	-	-	-	-	-	-	-	-	-	-	-	-	-
21	CM	(England)	David Farrell	-	-	-	-	-	-	-	-	-	-	-	-	-	-	-
25	AM	(England)	Graham Fenton	2	2	1	1	-	-	-	-	-	-	-	-	1	-	134'
9	CF	(Wales)	Dean Saunders	7	7	7	-	-	4	2	-	-	-	-	-	-	1	660'
10	CF	(England)	Dalian Atkinson	8	8	8	-	-	5	1	-	-	-	-	-	-	-	750'
11	RW	(England)	Tony Daley	6	5	4	1	1	-	1	-	-	-	-	-	1	-	361'
12	LW	(England)	Steve Froggatt	1	1	-	1	-	-	-	-	-	-	-	-	1	-	15'
18	CF	(Trinidad and Tobago)	Dwight Yorke	-	-	-	-	-	-	-	-	-	-	-	-	-	-	-
22	CF	(England)	Guy Whittingham	4	2	2	-	2	-	-	-	-	-	-	-	-	1	165'

=== UEFA Cup ===
#	Pos	Nat	Player	Sqd	App	FXI	Sub	Unu	Gls	Ast	O.G.	C.S.	Yellow card	(yellow card) (yellow-red card)	Red card	Substituted on	Substituted off	
1	GK	(England)	Nigel Spink	4	2	2	-	2	-	-	-	1	-	-	-	-	-	180'
13	GK	(Australia)	Mark Bosnich	2	2	2	-	-	-	-	-	-	-	-	-	-	-	180'
30	GK	(England)	Michael Oakes	2	-	-	-	2	-	-	-	-	-	-	-	-	-	-
2	RB	(England)	Earl Barrett	3	3	3	-	-	-	-	-	-	-	-	-	-	-	270'
3	LB	(Republic of Ireland)	Steve Staunton	2	2	2	-	-	-	-	-	-	-	-	-	-	-	180'
4	CB	(England)	Shaun Teale	4	4	4	-	-	-	-	-	-	-	-	-	-	-	360'
5	CB	(Republic of Ireland)	Paul McGrath	4	4	4	-	-	-	-	-	-	-	-	-	-	-	360'
16	CB	(England)	Ugo Ehiogu	2	-	-	-	2	-	-	-	-	-	-	-	-	-	-
17	CB	(England)	Neil Cox	3	1	1	-	2	-	-	-	-	-	-	-	-	-	90'
23	LB	(England)	Bryan Small	3	2	2	-	1	-	-	-	-	1	-	-	-	-	180'
24	RB	(Poland)	Dariusz Kubicki	-	-	-	-	-	-	-	-	-	-	-	-	-	-	-
6	CM	(England)	Kevin Richardson	4	4	4	-	-	-	-	-	-	1	-	-	-	-	270'
7	CM	(Republic of Ireland)	Ray Houghton	4	2	1	1	2	-	-	-	-	-	-	-	1	-	118'
8	CM	(England)	Garry Parker	3	-	-	-	3	-	-	-	-	-	-	-	-	-	-
14	CM	(Republic of Ireland)	Andy Townsend	4	4	4	-	-	1	-	-	-	1	-	-	-	-	360'
15	CM	(England)	Gordon Cowans	4	4	4	-	-	-	-	-	-	-	-	-	-	1	332'
19	AM	(Germany)	Stefan Beinlich	-	-	-	-	-	-	-	-	-	-	-	-	-	-	-
20	AM	(Germany)	Matthias Breitkreutz	-	-	-	-	-	-	-	-	-	-	-	-	-	-	-
21	CM	(England)	David Farrell	-	-	-	-	-	-	-	-	-	-	-	-	-	-	-
25	AM	(England)	Graham Fenton	-	-	-	-	-	-	-	-	-	-	-	-	-	-	-
9	CF	(Wales)	Dean Saunders	4	4	4	-	-	1	-	-	-	-	-	-	-	-	360'
10	CF	(England)	Dalian Atkinson	4	4	4	-	-	1	-	-	-	-	-	-	-	-	360'
11	RW	(England)	Tony Daley	4	2	2	-	2	-	-	-	-	-	-	-	-	-	180'
12	LW	(England)	Steve Froggatt	-	-	-	-	-	-	-	-	-	-	-	-	-	-	-
18	CF	(Trinidad and Tobago)	Dwight Yorke	-	-	-	-	-	-	-	-	-	-	-	-	-	-	-
22	CF	(England)	Guy Whittingham	4	1	1	-	3	-	-	-	-	-	-	-	-	-	90'

=== Goals Involvements ===
Rank	#	Nat	Player	Pos	Apps	Goal Inv.	Premier League		FA Cup		League Cup		UEFA Cup		Total	
Rank	#	Nat	Player	Pos	Apps	Goal Inv.	Goals	Assists	Goals	Assists	Goals	Assists	Goals	Assists	Goals	Assists
1	10	(England)	Dalian Atkinson	CF	44	23	8	5	0	1	6	1	1	1	15	8
2	9	(Wales)	Dean Saunders	CF	52	21	10	3	1	0	4	1	1	0	17	4
3	6	(England)	Kevin Richardson	CM	55	14	5	5	0	0	2	2	0	0	7	7
4	14	(Republic of Ireland)	Andy Townsend	CM	47	11	3	6	0	0	0	1	1	0	4	7
5	7	(Republic of Ireland)	Ray Houghton	CM	41	8	2	3	1	0	2	0	0	0	5	3
6	11	(England)	Tony Daley	RW	37	7	1	3	0	0	0	3	0	0	1	6
7	8	(England)	Garry Parker	CM	23	5	2	2	0	0	0	1	0	0	2	3
8	22	(England)	Guy Whittingham	CF	21	3	3	0	0	0	0	0	0	0	3	0
9	18	(Trinidad and Tobago)	Dwight Yorke	CF	14	3	2	0	1	0	0	0	0	0	3	0
10	17	(England)	Neil Cox	RB	29	3	2	1	0	0	0	0	0	0	2	1
11	3	(Republic of Ireland)	Steve Staunton	LB	32	3	3	1	0	0	0	1	0	0	1	2
12	4	(England)	Shaun Teale	CB	51	2	1	0	0	0	1	0	0	0	2	0
13	19	(Germany)	Stefan Beinlich	AM	7	2	1	1	0	0	0	0	0	0	1	1
14	5	(Republic of Ireland)	Paul McGrath	CB	44	2	0	1	0	0	0	0	0	0	1	1
15	12	(England)	Steve Froggatt	LW	11	1	1	0	0	0	0	0	0	0	1	0
16	25	(England)	Graham Fenton	AM	14	1	1	0	0	0	0	0	0	0	1	0
17	-	-	Own Goal	-	-	1	1	0	0	0	0	0	0	0	1	0
18	2	(England)	Earl Barrett	RB	52	1	0	0	0	0	1	0	0	0	1	0

=== Clean Sheets ===
Rank	#	Nat	Player	Apps	Conceded	Clean Sheets	Premier League		FA Cup		League Cup		UEFA Cup	
Rank	#	Nat	Player	Apps	Conceded	Clean Sheets	Con	CS	Con	CS	Con	CS	Con	CS
1	13	(Australia)	Mark Bosnich	41	40	12	29	9	2	1	7	2	2	0
2	1	(England)	Nigel Spink	18	22	6	21	4	0	0	0	1	1	1

== See also ==
- List of Aston Villa F.C. records and statistics
