= 1991–92 Aston Villa F.C. season =

English football club season

Aston Villa
1991–92 season
- Chairman: Doug Ellis
- Manager: Ron Atkinson
- Stadium: Villa Park
- First Division: 7th
- FA Cup: Quarter finals
- League Cup: Second round
- Full Members Cup: Quarter finals
- Top goalscorer: League: Regis/Yorke (11); All: Yorke (16)
- Average home league attendance: 24,818

The 1991–92 English football season was Aston Villa's 93rd season in the Football League. Villa competed in the Football League First Division. Ron Atkinson took charge of the team taking over from Josef Venglos.

Aston Villa improved on the previous season's poor 17th-place finish to finish 7th, under new manager Ron Atkinson. This came despite an horrendous run of form from New Year's Day, which saw them win just one game and score only two goals in twelve league matches.

Villa's new manager made many new signings in the months following his June 1991 arrival at Villa Park, including new goalkeeper Les Sealey, teenage defender Ugo Ehiogu, striker Dalian Atkinson and mid-season signing Earl Barrett. Other debuts included Steve Staunton, Shaun Teale, Paul Mortimer, Kevin Richardson, Cyrille Regis, Dariusz Kubicki, Bryan Small, Alan McLoughlin, Neil Cox, Stefan Beinlich, Martin Carruthers, Garry Parker, Steve Froggatt, Matthias Breitkreutz and Mark Bosnich.

Top scorer was Trinidadian striker Dwight Yorke, who scored 11 times in the First Division and 17 times in all competitions.

== Final league table ==
Pos	Team	Pld	W	D	L	GF	GA	GD	Pts	Qualification or relegation
5	Manchester City	42	20	10	12	61	48	+13	70	Qualification for the FA Premier League
6	Liverpool	42	16	16	10	47	40	+7	64	Qualification for the European Cup Winners' Cup first round and qualification for the FA Premier League
7	Aston Villa	42	17	9	16	48	44	+4	60	Qualification for the FA Premier League
8	Nottingham Forest	42	16	11	15	60	58	+2	59	Qualification for the FA Premier League
9	Sheffield United	42	16	9	17	65	63	+2	57	Qualification for the FA Premier League

Source: World Football
Rules for classification: 1) Points; 2) Goal difference; 3) Goals scored

== Results ==
Aston Villa's score comes first

=== Legend ===
Win	Draw	Loss

=== Football League First Division ===
Date	Opponent	Venue	Result	Attendance	Scorers
17 August 1991	Sheffield Wednesday	A	3–2	36,749	Atkinson 42', Regis 51', Staunton 85'
21 August 1991	Manchester United	H	0–1	39,995	
24 August 1991	Arsenal	H	3–1	29,684	Staunton (pen) 40', Penrice 53', Daley 76'
28 August 1991	West Ham United	A	1–3	23,644	Daley 49'
31 August 1991	Southampton	A	1–1	16,161	Richardson 2'
4 September 1991	Crystal Palace	H	0–1	20,740	
7 September 1991	Tottenham Hotspur	H	0–0	33,096	
14 September 1991	Liverpool	A	1–1	38,400	Richardson 25'
18 September 1991	Chelsea	A	0–2	17,182	
21 September 1991	Nottingham Forest	H	3–1	28,506	Blake 48', Richardson 62', Yorke 63'
28 September 1991	Coventry City	A	0–1	17,851	
5 October 1991	Luton Town	H	4–0	18,722	Richardson 3', Regis 46', Yorke 59', Mortimer 80'
19 October 1991	Everton	A	2–0	27,688	Regis 32', Daley 66'
26 October 1991	Wimbledon	H	2–1	16,928	Olney 9', Yorke 29'
2 November 1991	Queens Park Rangers	A	1–0	10,642	Yorke 44'
16 November 1991	Notts County	H	1–0	23,020	Yorke 29'
24 November 1991	Leeds United	H	1–4	23,713	Yorke 67'
30 November 1991	Oldham Athletic	A	2–3	15,370	Blake 10', Regis 58'
7 December 1991	Manchester City	H	3–1	26,265	Regis 26', Yorke 40', Daley 70'
14 December 1991	Sheffield United	A	0–2	18,401	
26 December 1991	West Ham United	H	3–1	31,959	Yorke 33', Daley 42', Richardson 90'
28 December 1991	Southampton	H	2–1	23,094	Regis 16', Yorke 87'
1 January 1992	Norwich City	A	1–2	15,318	Regis 74'
11 January 1992	Arsenal	A	0–0	31,413	
18 January 1992	Sheffield Wednesday	H	0–1	28,036	
22 January 1992	Manchester United	A	0–1	45,022	
2 February 1992	Everton	H	0–0	17,451	
8 February 1992	Wimbledon	A	0–2	5,534	
22 February 1992	Oldham Athletic	H	1–0	20,509	Regis 52'
29 February 1992	Manchester City	A	0–2	28,268	
3 March 1992	Leeds United	A	0–0	28,896	
10 March 1992	Notts County	A	0–0	8,389	
14 March 1992	Queens Park Rangers	H	0–1	19,630	
21 March 1992	Crystal Palace	A	0–0	15,368	
28 March 1992	Norwich City	H	1–0	16,985	Staunton 79'
31 March 1992	Sheffield United	H	1–1	15,745	Regis 89'
4 April 1992	Tottenham Hotspur	A	5–2	26,370	Richardson 20', Olney 31', Yorke 58', Daley 86', Regis 90'
11 April 1992	Liverpool	H	1–0	35,755	Daley 65'
18 April 1992	Nottingham Forest	A	0–2	22,800	
20 April 1992	Chelsea	H	3–1	19,269	Staunton 32', McGrath 64', Parker 89'
25 April 1992	Luton Town	A	0–2	11,178	
2 May 1992	Coventry City	H	2–0	31,984	Regis 1', Yorke 36'

=== FA Cup ===
Round	Date	Opponent	Venue	Result	Attendance	Goalscorers
R3	5 January 1992	Tottenham Hotspur	H	0–0	29,316	
R3R	14 January 1992	Tottenham Hotspur	A	1–0	25,462	Yorke 11'
R4	5 February 1992	Derby County	A	4–3	22,452	Yorke 8', 19', 40', Parker 23'
R5	16 February 1992	Swindon Town	A	2–1	16,402	Yorke 39', Froggatt 63'
QF	8 March 1992	Liverpool	A	0–1	29,109	

=== League Cup ===
Round	Date	Opponent	Venue	Result	Attendance	Goalscorers
R2 1st leg	25 September 1991	Grimsby Town	A	0–0	13,835	
R2 2nd leg	9 October 1991	Grimsby Town	H	1–1 (lost on away goals)	15,338	Teale 70'

=== Full Members Cup ===
Round	Date	Opponent	Venue	Result	Attendance	Goalscorers
SR2	23 October 1991	Coventry City	A	2–0	6,447	Olney 52', Yorke 62'
SQF	26 November 1991	Nottingham Forest	H	0–2	7,858	

== Squad ==
Note: Flags indicate national team as defined under FIFA eligibility rules; some limited exceptions apply. Players may hold more than one non-FIFA nationality.

Pos.	Nation	Player
GK	AUS	Mark Bosnich
GK	ENG	Les Sealey
GK	ENG	Nigel Spink
DF	ENG	Earl Barrett
DF	ENG	Neil Cox
DF	ENG	Ugo Ehiogu
DF	POL	Dariusz Kubicki
DF	IRL	Paul McGrath
DF	ENG	Bryan Small
DF	IRL	Steve Staunton
MF	GER	Stefan Beinlich
MF	ENG	Mark Blake
MF	GER	Matthias Breitkreutz
MF	ENG	Tony Daley

Pos.	Nation	Player
MF	ENG	David Farrell
MF	IRL	Gareth Farrelly
MF	ENG	Steve Froggatt
MF	IRL	Alan McLoughlin
MF	ENG	Garry Parker
MF	ENG	Kevin Richardson (captain)
MF	ENG	Shaun Teale
FW	ENG	Dalian Atkinson
FW	ENG	Martin Carruthers
FW	ENG	Neil Davis
FW	ENG	Graham Fenton
FW	ENG	Ian Olney
FW	ENG	Cyrille Regis
FW	TTO	Dwight Yorke

=== Left club during season ===
Note: Flags indicate national team as defined under FIFA eligibility rules; some limited exceptions apply. Players may hold more than one non-FIFA nationality.

Pos.	Nation	Player
DF	ENG	Derek Mountfield (to Wolves)
DF	DEN	Kent Nielsen (to AGF)
MF	ENG	Gordon Cowans (to Blackburn Rovers)
MF	ENG	Kevin Gage (to Sheffield United)

Pos.	Nation	Player
MF	ENG	Paul Mortimer (to Crystal Palace)
FW	ENG	Ian Ormondroyd (to Derby County)
FW	ENG	Gary Penrice (to Queen's Park Rangers)
DF	ENG	Chris Price (to Blackburn Rovers)

== Reserve squad ==
Note: Flags indicate national team as defined under FIFA eligibility rules; some limited exceptions apply. Players may hold more than one non-FIFA nationality.

Pos. / Nation / Player; GK / ENG / Michael Oakes	Pos. / Nation / Player; MF / ENG / Lee Williams

== Transfers ==
=== In ===
Date	Pos	Name	From	Fee
2 July 1991	FW	Cyrille Regis	Coventry City	Free transfer
11 July 1991	FW	Dalian Atkinson	Real Sociedad	£1,600,000
12 July 1991	DF	Ugo Ehiogu	West Bromwich Albion	£40,000
19 July 1991	GK	Les Sealey	Manchester United	Free transfer
24 July 1991	MF	Paul Mortimer	Charlton Athletic	£350,000
25 July 1991	MF	Shaun Teale	Bournemouth	£300,000
6 August 1991	MF	Kevin Richardson	Real Sociedad	£450,000
7 August 1991	DF	Steve Staunton	Liverpool	£1,100,000
28 August 1991	DF	Dariusz Kubicki	Legia Warsaw	£200,000
29 November 1991	MF	Garry Parker	Nottingham Forest	£650,000
6 January 1992	MF	David Farrell	Redditch United	£45,000
25 February 1992	DF	Earl Barrett	Oldham Athletic	£1,700,000
28 February 1992	GK	Mark Bosnich	Manchester United	Free transfer
3 April 1992	MF	Trevor Berry	Bournemouth	£50,000

=== Out ===
Date	Pos	Name	To	Fee
18 July 1991	FW	Tony Cascarino	Celtic	£1,100,000
20 July 1991	MF	David Platt	Bari	£5,500,000
22 July 1991	GK	Lee Butler	Barnsley	£165,000
1 August 1991	DF	Craig Liddle	Blyth Spartans	Free transfer
6 August 1991	MF	Gareth Williams	Barnsley	£200,000
8 August 1991	DF	Andy Comyn	Derby County	£200,000
19 September 1991	FW	Ian Ormondroyd	Derby County	£350,000
18 October 1991	MF	Paul Mortimer	Crystal Palace	£500,000
29 October 1991	FW	Gary Penrice	Queens Park Rangers	£625,000
7 November 1991	DF	Derek Mountfield	Wolverhampton Wanderers	£150,000
15 November 1991	MF	Kevin Gage	Sheffield United	£150,000
28 November 1991	MF	Gordon Cowans	Blackburn Rovers	£200,000
1 February 1992	DF	Chris Price	Blackburn Rovers	£120,000

Transfers in: ▼£2,290,000
Transfers out: ▲£9,260,000
Total spending: ▲£6,970,000

== See also ==
- List of Aston Villa F.C. records and statistics
