= 1994 Football League Cup final =

- Event: 1993–94 Football League Cup
Aston Villa	Manchester United
3	1
- Date: 27 March 1994
- Venue: Wembley Stadium, London
- Man of the Match: Kevin Richardson (Aston Villa)
- Referee: Keith Cooper (Glamorgan)
- Attendance: 77,231

The 1994 Football League Cup final took place on 27 March 1994 at the old Wembley Stadium. It was contested between Manchester United and Aston Villa. Aston Villa won 3–1, with one goal from Dalian Atkinson and two from Dean Saunders, to claim their fourth League Cup final victory; Manchester United's goal was scored by Mark Hughes, before Andrei Kanchelskis was sent off for handball. Manchester United won both the Premier League and the FA Cup that season, this result denying United a domestic treble, while Villa finished 10th in the Premier League.

== Route to the final ==
Aston Villa			Round	Manchester United		
Birmingham City	0–1	Aston Villa	Round 2	Stoke City	2–1	Manchester United
Aston Villa	1–0	Birmingham City	Round 2	Manchester United	2–0	Stoke City
Aston Villa won 2–0 on aggregate			Round 2	Manchester United won 3–2 on aggregate		
Sunderland	1–4	Aston Villa	Round 3	Manchester United	5–1	Leicester City
Arsenal	0–1	Aston Villa	Round 4	Everton	0–2	Manchester United
Tottenham Hotspur	1–2	Aston Villa	Round 5	Manchester United	2–2	Portsmouth
Tottenham Hotspur	1–2	Aston Villa	Round 5	Portsmouth	0–1	Manchester United
Tranmere Rovers	3–1	Aston Villa	Semi-finals	Manchester United	1–0	Sheffield Wednesday
Aston Villa	3–1	Tranmere Rovers	Semi-finals	Sheffield Wednesday	1–4	Manchester United
Aston Villa won 5–4 on penalties			Semi-finals	Manchester United won 5–1 on aggregate		

== Match ==
=== Summary ===
Aston Villa had finished runners-up to Manchester United in the league the previous season, but were in poor form going into the League Cup final, having lost their last three games. The bookmakers and national press were predicting that the Villa would be beaten comfortably at Wembley. Manchester United had suffered a slight blip of their own with a couple of draws in their previous league matches and high-profile red cards to Eric Cantona and Peter Schmeichel – but victory in the League Cup was predicted to be the first part of a domestic treble. Alex Ferguson decided to field a full-strength team with the exception of the suspended Schmeichel, who was deputised by former Villa keeper Les Sealey. Villa boss Ron Atkinson decided to field a five-man midfield with Tony Daley and Dalian Atkinson on the flanks and young attacking midfielder Graham Fenton playing in a withdrawn role behind striker Dean Saunders.

The match began with Aston Villa playing a fast counter-attacking game. United saw a lot of the ball, but the Villa defence, marshalled by former Manchester United centre-back Paul McGrath, rendered Cantona anonymous. There was a scare for Villa when Mark Bosnich looked to have brought down Roy Keane outside the box, but the referee waved play on. Aston Villa's only chance in the first quarter of the match had been an inswinging corner from Steve Staunton which was touched over by Sealey. On 25 minutes, however, Andy Townsend played a pass into the feet of Dean Saunders who flicked the ball over the top of United's defence and into the path of Atkinson, who put his side 1–0 up.

In the second half, the pattern of the game remained the same, United sluggish and Villa playing a counter-attacking game. On 70 minutes, Kevin Richardson tackled United substitute Lee Sharpe who looked certain to score. Five minutes later, Villa went down the other end and earned a free kick when Daley was brought down just outside the United box. Richardson swung it in and Saunders stuck a leg out to divert it into the net for Villa's second goal. Mark Hughes pulled a goal back for United with seven minutes remaining and was denied a second just moments later when Bosnich pushed a volley round the post. With time nearly up Villa broke once more, Daley striking the United post with a fantastic shot. The ball fell to Atkinson who hit it goalwards only for the ball to strike Andrei Kanchelskis on the hand. The Russian was to be red carded and could only watch as Dean Saunders converted the resulting penalty to complete the scoring in a 3–1 victory for Aston Villa.

The match was also the last to be covered on the original BBC Radio 5; the station closed down that night, with BBC Radio 5 Live launching the following morning.

=== Details ===
27 March 1994
17:00

Aston Villa	3–1	Manchester United
Atkinson 26'; Saunders 76', 90+1' (pen.)	Report	Hughes 83'

Wembley Stadium, London
Attendance: 77,231
Referee: Keith Cooper (Glamorgan)

Aston Villa	Manchester United

GK	13	(Australia) Mark Bosnich
RB	2	(England) Earl Barrett
CB	5	(Republic of Ireland) Paul McGrath
CB	4	(England) Shaun Teale
LB	3	(Republic of Ireland) Steve Staunton	(substituted off) 79'
RM	10	(England) Dalian Atkinson
CM	6	(England) Kevin Richardson (c)
CM	14	(Republic of Ireland) Andy Townsend
LM	11	(England) Tony Daley
AM	25	(England) Graham Fenton
CF	9	(Wales) Dean Saunders
Substitutes:
GK	1	(England) Nigel Spink
DF	17	(England) Neil Cox	(substituted on) 79'
MF	7	(Republic of Ireland) Ray Houghton
Manager:
(England) Ron Atkinson

GK	13	(England) Les Sealey
RB	2	(England) Paul Parker
CB	4	(England) Steve Bruce (c)		(substituted off) 83'
CB	6	(England) Gary Pallister
LB	3	(Republic of Ireland) Denis Irwin
RM	14	(Russia) Andrei Kanchelskis	(red card) 90'
CM	16	(Republic of Ireland) Roy Keane
CM	8	(England) Paul Ince
LM	11	(Wales) Ryan Giggs		(substituted off) 68'
CF	10	(Wales) Mark Hughes
CF	7	(France) Eric Cantona
Substitutes:
GK	25	(England) Gary Walsh
MF	5	(England) Lee Sharpe		(substituted on) 68'
FW	9	(Scotland) Brian McClair		(substituted on) 83'
Manager:
(Scotland) Alex Ferguson

Alan Hardaker Trophy (Man of the Match)

- Kevin Richardson (Aston Villa)

Match officials

- Linesmen:
  - John Elwin (Norfolk)
  - Rob Harris (Oxfordshire)
- Reserve referee: Peter Foakes (Essex)

Match rules

- 90 minutes
- 30 minutes of extra-time if necessary
- Match to be replayed if scores still level
- Three named substitutes, of which two may be used
