= Gioacchini =

Gioacchini is an Italian surname. Notable people with the surname include:

- Nicholas Gioacchini (born 2000), American soccer player
- Stefano Gioacchini (born 1976), Italian footballer

== Origins ==
The name Gioacchini comes from the Italian name "Gioacchino"; which is derived from the Hebrew name "Yehoiakim". The name also is historically associated with Joachim, the father of Mary, the mother of Jesus. Many people choose to name their children this name because of the religious significance. The name Gioacchini in modern times symbolizes pride in heritage.
