= 1998–99 Coventry City F.C. season =

Coventry City F.C.
1998–99 season
- Chairman: Bryan Richardson
- Manager: Gordon Strachan
- Stadium: Highfield Road
- FA Premier League: 15th
- FA Cup: Fifth round
- League Cup: Third round
- Top goalscorer: League: Whelan (10); All: Whelan (13)
- Highest home attendance: 23,098 (vs. Tottenham Hotspur, 26 December)
- Lowest home attendance: 6,631 (vs. Southend United, 16 September)
- Average home league attendance: 20,773

During the 1998–99 English football season, Coventry City competed in the FA Premier League.

== Season summary ==
Coventry City finished 15th in the FA Premier League – four places lower than last season – but were never in any real danger of being relegated, despite the loss of key striker Dion Dublin to local rivals Aston Villa.

The biggest news of Coventry's season was the announcement of a move to a new 45,000-seat stadium at Foleshill, which was anticipated to be ready by 2002. Manager Gordon Strachan then signed Moroccan international football star Mustapha Hadji, knowing that it would be important to have a top quality team to match the forthcoming new home.

== Final league table ==
Pos	Team	Pld	W	D	L	GF	GA	GD	Pts	Qualification or relegation
13	Newcastle United	38	11	13	14	48	54	−6	46	Qualification for the UEFA Cup first round (Note: As Manchester United qualified for the Champions League, their UEFA Cup place as FA Cup winners defaulted to Newcastle United, the runners-up.)
14	Everton	38	11	10	17	42	47	−5	43	
15	Coventry City	38	11	9	18	39	51	−12	42	
16	Wimbledon	38	10	12	16	40	63	−23	42	
17	Southampton	38	11	8	19	37	64	−27	41	

Source: Premier League
Rules for classification: 1) points; 2) goal difference; 3) number of goals scored.
Notes:

Results summary

Overall								Home						Away					
Pld	W	D	L	GF	GA	GD	Pts	W	D	L	GF	GA	GD	W	D	L	GF	GA	GD
38	11	9	18	39	51	−12	42	8	6	5	26	21	+5	3	3	13	13	30	−17

Source: 1998-99 FA Premier League table

Results by round

Round	1	2	3	4	5	6	7	8	9	10	11	12	13	14	15	16	17	18	19	20	21	22	23	24	25	26	27	28	29	30	31	32	33	34	35	36	37	38
Ground	H	A	H	A	A	H	A	H	H	A	H	A	H	A	H	A	A	H	H	A	H	A	H	A	A	H	A	H	H	A	A	H	A	H	A	H	A	H
Result	W	L	D	L	L	L	D	L	W	L	L	W	W	L	D	L	L	D	D	L	W	L	W	D	L	L	W	W	D	L	W	W	L	L	L	W	D	D
Position	2	8	10	16	18	19	19	19	19	18	19	17	15	16	17	17	17	17	17	17	17	17	16	16	17	18	17	15	15	16	15	15	15	16	16	16	16	15

Source: 11v11.com: 1998-99 Coventry City results
A = Away; H = Home; W = Win; D = Draw; L = Loss

== Results ==
Coventry City's score comes first

=== Legend ===
Win	Draw	Loss

=== FA Premier League ===
Date	Opponent	Venue	Result	Attendance	Scorers
15 August 1998	Chelsea	H	2–1	23,042	Huckerby, Dublin
22 August 1998	Nottingham Forest	A	0–1	22,546	
29 August 1998	West Ham United	H	0–0	20,818	
9 September 1998	Liverpool	A	0–2	41,771	
12 September 1998	Manchester United	A	0–2	55,193	
19 September 1998	Newcastle United	H	1–5	22,656	Whelan
26 September 1998	Charlton Athletic	A	1–1	20,043	Whelan
3 October 1998	Aston Villa	H	1–2	22,654	Soltvedt
18 October 1998	Sheffield Wednesday	H	1–0	16,006	Dublin
24 October 1998	Southampton	A	1–2	15,152	Dublin
31 October 1998	Arsenal	H	0–1	23,040	
7 November 1998	Blackburn Rovers	A	2–1	23,779	Huckerby, Whelan
15 November 1998	Everton	H	3–0	19,290	Froggatt, Huckerby, Whelan
21 November 1998	Middlesbrough	A	0–2	34,293	
28 November 1998	Leicester City	H	1–1	19,894	Huckerby
5 December 1998	Wimbledon	A	1–2	11,717	McAllister (pen)
14 December 1998	Leeds United	A	0–2	31,802	
19 December 1998	Derby County	H	1–1	16,627	Whelan
26 December 1998	Tottenham Hotspur	H	1–1	23,098	Aloisi
28 December 1998	West Ham United	A	0–2	25,662	
9 January 1999	Nottingham Forest	H	4–0	17,172	Huckerby (3), Telfer
16 January 1999	Chelsea	A	1–2	34,869	Huckerby
30 January 1999	Liverpool	H	2–1	23,056	Boateng, Whelan
6 February 1999	Tottenham Hotspur	A	0–0	34,376	
17 February 1999	Newcastle United	A	1–4	36,352	Whelan
20 February 1999	Manchester United	H	0–1	22,596	
27 February 1999	Aston Villa	A	4–1	38,799	Aloisi (2), Boateng (2)
6 March 1999	Charlton Athletic	H	2–1	20,259	Whelan, Soltvedt
13 March 1999	Blackburn Rovers	H	1–1	19,701	Aloisi
20 March 1999	Arsenal	A	0–2	38,073	
3 April 1999	Sheffield Wednesday	A	2–1	28,136	McAllister (pen), Whelan
5 April 1999	Southampton	H	1–0	21,402	Boateng
11 April 1999	Everton	A	0–2	32,341	
17 April 1999	Middlesbrough	H	1–2	19,231	McAllister
24 April 1999	Leicester City	A	0–1	20,224	
1 May 1999	Wimbledon	H	2–1	21,200	Huckerby, Whelan
8 May 1999	Derby County	A	0–0	32,450	
16 May 1999	Leeds United	H	2–2	23,049	Aloisi, Telfer

=== FA Cup ===
Round	Date	Opponent	Venue	Result	Attendance	Goalscorers
R3	2 January 1999	Macclesfield Town	H	7–0	14,197	Froggatt, Whelan, Payne (own goal), Huckerby (3), Boateng
R4	23 January 1999	Leicester City	A	3–0	21,207	Whelan, Froggatt, Telfer
R5	13 February 1999	Everton	A	1–2	33,907	McAllister

=== League Cup ===
Round	Date	Opponent	Venue	Result	Attendance	Goalscorers
R2 1st Leg	16 September 1998	Southend United	H	1–0	6,631	Hall
R2 2nd Leg	22 September 1998	Southend United	A	4–0 (won 5–0 on agg)	6,292	Boateng, Dublin, Whelan, Soltvedt
R3	27 October 1998	Luton Town	A	0–2	9,051	

== Squad ==
Note: Flags indicate national team as defined under FIFA eligibility rules; some limited exceptions apply. Players may hold more than one non-FIFA nationality.

No.	Pos.	Nation	Player
1	GK	SWE	Magnus Hedman
2	DF	SWE	Roland Nilsson
3	DF	ENG	David Burrows
4	DF	ENG	Paul Williams
5	DF	ENG	Richard Shaw
6	DF	IRL	Gary Breen
7	FW	ENG	Darren Huckerby
8	FW	ENG	Noel Whelan
9	DF	BIH	Muhamed Konjić
10	MF	SCO	Gary McAllister (captain)
11	MF	NED	George Boateng
12	MF	SCO	Paul Telfer
13	FW	ITA	Stefano Gioacchini
14	MF	NOR	Trond Egil Soltvedt
15	FW	JAM	Paul Hall
16	GK	ENG	Steve Ogrizovic
17	DF	ENG	Ian Brightwell
18	DF	BEL	Philippe Clement
19	DF	ENG	Marcus Hall
20	MF	SCO	Gavin Strachan
21	FW	ENG	Andy Ducros
22	MF	BEL	Laurent Delorge
23	GK	AUS	Tynan Scope

No.	Pos.	Nation	Player
24	DF	IRL	Liam Daish
25	MF	IRL	Willie Boland
26	MF	ENG	Steve Froggatt
27	DF	ENG	Marc Edworthy
28	FW	AUS	John Aloisi
29	DF	ENG	Sam Shilton
30	DF	IRL	Barry Quinn
31	MF	ENG	Chris Barnett
32	MF	ENG	John Eustace
33	DF	ENG	Mark Burrows
34	DF	ENG	Richard Colwell
35	FW	IRL	Martin Devaney
36	DF	ENG	Jamie Williams
37	FW	ENG	Craig Faulconbridge
38	DF	IRL	Barry Prenderville
39	MF	ENG	Rob Miller
40	FW	ENG	Gary McSheffrey
41	MF	SCO	Craig Strachan
42	FW	ENG	Chukki Eribenne
43	GK	ENG	Chris Kirkland
44	DF	ENG	Craig Pead
45	DF	SCO	Gerard Mooney
46	FW	SCO	Stephen McPhee

=== Left club during season ===
Note: Flags indicate national team as defined under FIFA eligibility rules; some limited exceptions apply. Players may hold more than one non-FIFA nationality.

No.	Pos.	Nation	Player
9	FW	ENG	Dion Dublin (to Aston Villa)
9	FW	SCO	Darren Jackson (on loan from Celtic)

No.	Pos.	Nation	Player
13	DF	FRA	Jean-Guy Wallemme (to Sochaux)
22	FW	WAL	Simon Haworth (to Wigan Athletic)

=== Reserve squad ===
Note: Flags indicate national team as defined under FIFA eligibility rules; some limited exceptions apply. Players may hold more than one non-FIFA nationality.

No.	Pos.	Nation	Player
-	GK	DEN	Morten Hyldgaard
-	DF	IRL	Barry Ferguson

No.	Pos.	Nation	Player
-	MF	ENG	Robert Betts
-	MF	IRL	Daire Doyle

== Transfers ==
=== In ===
Date	Pos.	Name	From	Fee
4 June 1998	DF	(France) Jean-Guy Wallemme	(France) RC Lens	Undisclosed
1 August 1998	DF	(Croatia) Robert Jarni	(Spain) Real Betis	£2,600,000
7 August 1998	FW	(Jamaica) Paul Hall	(England) Portsmouth	£300,000
26 August 1998	DF	(England) Marc Edworthy	(England) Crystal Palace	£1,200,000
1 October 1998	MF	(England) Steve Froggatt	(England) Wolverhampton Wanderers	£1,900,000
12 October 1998	MF	(Belgium) Laurent Delorge	(Belgium) Gent	£1,250,000
17 December 1998	FW	(Australia) John Aloisi	(England) Portsmouth	£650,000
30 December 1998	GK	(Denmark) Morten Hyldgaard	(Denmark) Ikast FS	£200,000
13 January 1999	DF	(Bosnia and Herzegovina) Muhamed Konjić	(France) AS Monaco	£2,000,000
28 May 1999	MF	(Morocco) Youssef Chippo	(Portugal) Porto	£1,200,000

=== Out ===
Date	Pos.	Name	To	Fee
8 July 1998	MF	(England) John Salako	(England) Fulham	Free transfer
16 July 1998	FW	(Romania) Viorel Moldovan	(Turkey) Fenerbahçe	£4,000,000
15 August 1998	DF	(Croatia) Robert Jarni	(Spain) Real Madrid	£3,400,000
2 October 1998	FW	(England) Simon Haworth	(England) Wigan Athletic	£600,000
5 November 1998	FW	(England) Dion Dublin	(England) Aston Villa	£5,750,000
30 December 1998	DF	(France) Jean-Guy Wallemme	(France) Sochaux	£400,000

Transfers in: ▼£11,300,000
Transfers out: ▲£14,150,000
Total spending: ▲£2,850,000

== Statistics ==
=== Appearances and goals ===
No.	Pos	Nat	Player	Total		FA Premier League		FA Cup		League Cup	
No.	Pos	Nat	Player	Apps	Goals	Apps	Goals	Apps	Goals	Apps	Goals
Goalkeepers
1	GK	(Sweden) SWE	Magnus Hedman	42	0	36	0	3	0	3	0
16	GK	(England) ENG	Steve Ogrizovic	2	0	2	0	0	0	0	0
Defenders
2	DF	(Sweden) SWE	Roland Nilsson	30	0	28	0	2	0	0	0
3	DF	(England) ENG	David Burrows	28	0	23	0	3	0	2	0
4	DF	(England) ENG	Paul Williams	26	0	20+2	0	2	0	1+1	0
5	DF	(England) ENG	Richard Shaw	43	0	36+1	0	3	0	3	0
6	DF	(Republic of Ireland) IRL	Gary Breen	28	0	21+4	0	1	0	2	0
9	DF	(Bosnia and Herzegovina) BIH	Muhamed Konjić	4	0	3+1	0	0	0	0	0
12	DF	(Scotland) SCO	Paul Telfer	37	3	30+2	2	0+3	1	2	0
17	DF	(England) ENG	Ian Brightwell	1	0	0	0	0	0	1	0
18	DF	(Belgium) BEL	Philippe Clement	16	0	6+6	0	1+1	0	1+1	0
19	DF	(England) ENG	Marcus Hall	6	0	2+3	0	0	0	1	0
27	DF	(England) ENG	Marc Edworthy	23	0	16+6	0	1	0	0	0
29	DF	(England) ENG	Sam Shilton	8	0	1+4	0	0+1	0	1+1	0
30	DF	(Republic of Ireland) IRL	Barry Quinn	8	0	6+1	0	0	0	1	0
Midfielders
10	MF	(Scotland) SCO	Gary McAllister	33	4	29	3	3	1	1	0
11	MF	(Netherlands) NED	George Boateng	38	6	29+3	4	3	1	3	1
14	MF	(Norway) NOR	Trond Egil Soltvedt	33	3	21+6	2	2+1	0	0+3	1
20	MF	(Scotland) SCO	Gavin Strachan	1	0	0	0	0	0	0+1	0
25	MF	(Republic of Ireland) IRL	Willie Boland	1	0	0	0	0	0	1	0
26	MF	(England) ENG	Steve Froggatt	26	3	23	1	3	2	0	0
Forwards
7	FW	(England) ENG	Darren Huckerby	39	12	31+3	9	3	3	2	0
8	FW	(England) ENG	Noel Whelan	36	13	31	10	3	2	2	1
9	FW	(Italy) ITA	Stefano Gioacchini	3	0	0+3	0	0	0	0	0
15	FW	(Jamaica) JAM	Paul Hall	11	1	2+7	0	0	0	2	1
28	FW	(Australia) AUS	John Aloisi	18	5	7+9	5	0+2	0	0	0
40	FW	(England) ENG	Gary McSheffrey	1	0	0+1	0	0	0	0	0
Players who left the club during the season
9	FW	(England) ENG	Dion Dublin	12	4	10	3	0	0	2	1
9	FW	(Scotland) SCO	Darren Jackson	3	0	0+3	0	0	0	0	0
13	MF	(France) FRA	Jean-Guy Wallemme	8	0	4+2	0	0	0	2	0
22	FW	(Wales) WAL	Simon Haworth	1	0	1	0	0	0	0	0
