= Steve Froggatt =

English footballer

Personal information
- Full name: Stephen Junior Froggatt
- Date of birth: 9 March 1973 (age 53)
- Place of birth: Lincoln, England
- Height: 1.78 m (5 ft 10 in)
- Position: Winger

Youth career
- 1989–1991: Aston Villa

Senior career*
| Years | Team | Apps | (Gls) |
| 1991–1994 | Aston Villa | 35 | (2) |
| 1994–1998 | Wolverhampton Wanderers | 106 | (7) |
| 1998–2001 | Coventry City | 49 | (2) |
| Total | | 190 | (11) |

International career
| 1992–1993 | England U21 | 2 | (0) |
- * Club domestic league appearances and goals

Stephen Junior Froggatt (born 9 March 1973) is an English former professional footballer. His senior playing career lasted from 1991 until 2001, when he announced his retirement after failing to recover from injury.

== Career ==
=== Aston Villa ===
Froggatt was born in Lincoln, Lincolnshire. Youth team coach Dave Richardson poached schoolboy player Froggatt from his old club Leicester. Froggatt began his career Aston Villa as a trainee, before turning professional and making his debut for the team in 1991. He truly established himself during the first Premier League season of 1992–93 as he made 21 appearances, scoring his first goal (against Crystal Palace) in the process, helping the club to end as runners-up. Villa won the League Cup in 1994 and although Froggatt was not part of the squad for the final he played in the semi-final first leg against Tranmere Rovers. He also won recognition from the England U21s, earning two caps during this season.

=== Wolverhampton Wanderers ===
Froggatt was sold to First Division Wolverhampton Wanderers in July 1994 for £1 million, where he linked up again with Graham Taylor, who had given him his YTS contract at Aston Villa. The winger played for four full seasons at Molineux as the club twice failed in the promotion play-offs. In total, he made 111 appearances for Wolves before being sold to a third West Midlands side, Coventry City.

=== Coventry City ===
Froggatt joined Premier League Coventry City for £1.9 million in October 1998, by coincidence making his debut against his first club. He was a first choice player throughout his time at Highfield Road and his form earned him a surprise call-up to Kevin Keegan's England national team squad in November 1999, over six years after his Under 21 appearances.

He went on to be an unused substitute for England in the first leg of the Euro 2000 qualifying Playoff match against Scotland on 13 November 1999 and also featured in the squad for the second leg and a friendly against Argentina in February 2000.

However, his playing career was suffered a fatal blow just days after being included in the England squad, as he was stretchered off after a horror tackle by Sunderland's Nicky Summerbee during a Premier League fixture on 12 February 2000. After trying to play on for a handful of further games, he underwent surgery on the injury in summer 2000. He spent the 2000–01 season on the sidelines trying to recover, but was forced to concede defeat and announced his retirement at the end of the season.

=== Post-retirement ===
Upon retiring, Froggatt became the press officer at Coventry City and now works as a personal trainer and often appears on television and radio as a football summariser.

== Career statistics ==
Appearances and goals by club, season and competition
| Club | Season | League | | | FA Cup | | League Cup | | Other | | Total | |
| Club | Season | Division | Apps | Goals | Apps | Goals | Apps | Goals | Apps | Goals | Apps | Goals |
|---|---|---|---|---|---|---|---|---|---|---|---|---|
| Aston Villa | 1991–92 | First Division | 9 | 0 | 3 | 1 | 0 | 0 | 0 | 0 | 12 | 1 |
| Aston Villa | 1992–93 | Premier League | 17 | 1 | 3 | 0 | 1 | 0 | — | | 21 | 1 |
| Aston Villa | 1993–94 | Premier League | 9 | 1 | 1 | 0 | 1 | 0 | 0 | 0 | 11 | 1 |
| Aston Villa | Total | | 35 | 2 | 7 | 1 | 2 | 0 | 0 | 0 | 44 | 3 |
| Wolverhampton Wanderers | 1994–95 | First Division | 20 | 2 | 0 | 0 | 3 | 1 | 2 (Note: Appearances in Anglo-Italian Cup) | 0 | 25 | 3 |
| Wolverhampton Wanderers | 1995–96 | First Division | 18 | 1 | 0 | 0 | 0 | 0 | — | | 18 | 1 |
| Wolverhampton Wanderers | 1996–97 | First Division | 27 | 2 | 0 | 0 | 2 | 0 | 0 | 0 | 29 | 2 |
| Wolverhampton Wanderers | 1997–98 | First Division | 33 | 2 | 3 | 0 | 3 | 1 | — | | 39 | 3 |
| Wolverhampton Wanderers | 1998–99 | First Division | 8 | 0 | — | | 3 | 0 | — | | 11 | 0 |
| Wolverhampton Wanderers | Total | | 106 | 7 | 3 | 0 | 11 | 2 | 2 | 0 | 122 | 9 |
| Coventry City | 1998–99 | Premier League | 23 | 1 | 3 | 2 | — | | — | | 26 | 3 |
| Coventry City | 1999–2000 | Premier League | 26 | 1 | 3 | 0 | 1 | 0 | — | | 30 | 1 |
| Coventry City | Total | | 49 | 2 | 6 | 2 | 1 | 0 | — | | 56 | 4 |
| Career total | | | 190 | 11 | 16 | 3 | 14 | 2 | 2 | 0 | 222 | 16 |

== Honours ==
Aston Villa

- League Cup: 1993–94

Individual

- First Division PFA Team of the Year: 1996–97
