= Respect (TV series) =

TV series

Respect was a seven-part documentary television series featuring some of the biggest names in British sport and was broadcast each Sunday at 5.00pm on Central Independent Television during November/December 1995.

The series of half-hour programmes was produced at Central Independent Television studios in Birmingham, and focused on sportspeople of African Caribbean origin who have gained "respect" through their single-minded determination to succeed in their chosen sport.

The subjects in the series were Lennox Lewis (Boxing), Judy Simpson (Athletics), Martin Offiah (Rugby League), Diana Bowles (Disabled Tennis), Tony Daley (Football), Gladstone Small (Cricket) and John Regis (Athletics). The narration was provided by sports presenter Garth Crooks.

series producer and director, Pogus Caesar. "Over the past decade, Britain has seen the tremendous impact and contribution of black people in sport on a worldwide scale." This will be the first series of its type which concentrates exclusively on black sportspeople, looking at their life stories and lifestyles and, perhaps more importantly, finding out what gives them the will to win. " Contributors to the series included Sharron Davies, Ian Botham, Nigel Benn, Henry Cooper, Denise Lewis, John Barnes, Roger Black, and Kriss Akabusi.

Respect was produced and directed by Pogus Caesar, and is a Carlton Television UK production and a Central Independent Television programme.
