= Stefan Beinlich =

German footballer

Personal information
- Date of birth: 13 January 1972 (age 54)
- Place of birth: East Berlin, East Germany
- Height: 1.80 m (5 ft 11 in)
- Position: Midfielder

Team information
- Current team: Hansa Rostock (academy manager); 1. LAV Rostock (managing director)

Youth career
- 1978–1986: BFC Dynamo
- 1987–1990: SG Bergmann-Borsig

Senior career*
Years	Team	Apps	(Gls)
1990–1991	SG Bergmann-Borsig	32	(14)
1991–1994	Aston Villa	16	(1)
1994–1997	Hansa Rostock	101	(34)
1997–2000	Bayer Leverkusen	80	(24)
2000–2003	Hertha BSC	64	(8)
2003–2006	Hamburger SV	68	(5)
2006–2008	Hansa Rostock	37	(1)
Total		398	(87)

International career
1998–2000	Germany	5	(0)
- * Club domestic league appearances and goals

Stefan "Paule" Beinlich (born 13 January 1972) is a German former professional footballer who played as a midfielder.

His main asset was a powerful long-range shot, and he often scored from free kicks; he was one of the first players from the country to play in the Premier League, spending three years at Aston Villa.

== Club career ==
Beinlich was born in East Berlin, and played as a youth for BFC Dynamo, making his first senior appearances for their feeder club, SG Bergmann-Borsig, In 1991, he moved to England with Aston Villa, signing along with his compatriot Matthias Breitkreutz, but both players had unassuming stints, appearing very rarely during their three-year stay. Beinlich's only goal for Villa came in a 5–1 defeat to Newcastle United in April 1994.

In 1994, he moved to Hansa Rostock, helping it promote in his first year, and scoring 19 times in the following two top level seasons combined (34 in total). Beinlich continued to display excellent football in his three seasons with Bayer 04 Leverkusen; in his last year, he tied a career-best 11 goals (in the first division) as the club lost the league to FC Bayern Munich on goal difference.

After three years apiece with Hertha BSC and Hamburger SV, with relative playing time, Beinlich retired in 2008, after two seasons with former side Hansa. He had to retire due to knee problems, and totalled 288 games in the first division, scoring 56 goals.

== International career ==
Beinlich's international debut for Germany occurred on 2 September 1998 against Malta, playing the whole 2–1 friendly win.

His last two matches were in 2000, also friendlies, before and after the European Championship, for which he was not picked.

== Post-retirement ==
On 30 May 2010, Beinlich was officially presented as Hansa Rostock's new director of football. On 8 June 2012, after Hansa had been relegated, Beinlich announced that he would resign at the end of the month. In January 2013, he then became managing director of 1. LAV Rostock. On 27 November 2019, Beinlich returned to Hansa Rostock once again, this time as the club's academy manager. Beinlich also still remained his position at 1. LAV Rostock.

== Honours ==
Hertha Berlin

- DFL-Ligapokal: 2001

Hamburger SV

- DFL-Ligapokal: 2003
- UEFA Intertoto Cup: 2005
