= Patryk Kubicki =

Polish footballer

Personal information
- Full name: Patryk Kubicki
- Date of birth: 9 October 1993 (age 33)
- Place of birth: Birmingham, England
- Height: 1.77 m (5 ft 9 1/2 in)
- Position: Midfielder

Youth career
- Sunderland
- Legia Warsaw
- Agrykola Warsaw
- AP Kubicki Warsaw
- Legia Warsaw
- Znicz Pruszków

Senior career*
Years	Team	Apps	(Gls)
2010	Dolcan Ząbki	13	(2)
2011–2012	ŁKS Łódź	11	(0)
2012–2013	Znicz Pruszków	8	(2)
2013–2014	Sibir Novosibirsk	15	(0)
2014–2019	Znicz Pruszków	111	(18)
2019–2020	Sokół Ostróda	18	(6)
2020–2021	Znicz Pruszków	17	(0)
2021–2024	Mszczonowianka Mszczonów	93	(45)
2024–2025	Orlęta Radzyń Podlaski	14	(4)
- * Club domestic league appearances and goals as of 5 February 2025

Patryk Kubicki (born 9 October 1993) is a Polish professional footballer who plays as a midfielder.

He is the son of Dariusz Kubicki.

== Career ==
Kubicki made his debut in the Russian National Football League for Sibir Novosibirsk on 7 July 2013 in a game against Torpedo Moscow.

On 17 July 2019, Kubicki joined Sokół Ostróda.

On 3 August 2020, he rejoined Znicz Pruszków.

== Honours ==
ŁKS Łódź

- I liga: 2010–11

Sokół Ostróda

- III liga, group I: 2019–20
