= Dalian Atkinson =

English footballer (1968–2016)

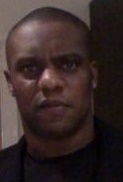

Personal information
- Full name: Dalian Robert Atkinson
- Date of birth: 21 March 1968
- Place of birth: Shrewsbury, Shropshire, England
- Date of death: 15 August 2016 (aged 48)
- Place of death: Telford, Shropshire, England
- Position: Striker

Senior career*
Years	Team	Apps	(Gls)
1985–1989	Ipswich Town	60	(18)
1989–1990	Sheffield Wednesday	38	(10)
1990–1991	Real Sociedad	29	(12)
1991–1995	Aston Villa	85	(25)
1995–1997	Fenerbahçe	21	(10)
1996	→ Metz (loan)	0	(0)
1996–1997	→ Manchester City (loan)	8	(2)
1997–1999	Al-Ittihad		
2001	Daejeon Hana Citizen	1	(0)
2001	Jeonbuk Hyundai Motors	4	(0)
Total		246+	(75+)

International career
1990	England B	1	(1)
- * Club domestic league appearances and goals

Dalian Robert Atkinson (21 March 1968 – 15 August 2016) was an English professional footballer who played as a striker.

During his club football career, he played in England for Ipswich Town, Sheffield Wednesday, Aston Villa and Manchester City, winning the Football League Cup at Villa in 1994 where he also played in the Premier League. He also played in Spain for Real Sociedad, in France for Metz, in Turkey for Fenerbahçe, in Saudi Arabia for Al-Ittihad, and in South Korea for Daejeon Hana Citizen and Jeonbuk Hyundai Motors. He was capped once at England B level, scoring a goal in that single appearance.

Atkinson died on 15 August 2016. He was near his father's house in Trench, Telford, where he had grown up. Officers of West Mercia Police, who had responded to a call, as Atkinson threatened to kill his father, fired a taser at him and one officer kicked him in the head. Atkinson went into cardiac arrest. The police officer who killed him was later found guilty of manslaughter and sentenced to eight years in prison.

== Club career ==
=== Early career ===
Atkinson first came to prominence at Ipswich Town as a teenager, impressing seasoned experts with his speed and daring, which included a hat-trick against a Middlesbrough side containing Gary Pallister and future Ipswich captain Tony Mowbray at the heart of their defence, in the 1987–88 season.

In 1989, manager Ron Atkinson (no relation) brought him to Sheffield Wednesday for £450,000 where he formed a fine front partnership with David Hirst for a single season. He was an ever-present in the league for Sheffield Wednesday in his only season there, scoring 10 goals but being unable to prevent them from being relegated.

After relegation he was sold to Real Sociedad for £1.7 million. The San Sebastián-based team had recently broken a tradition of only signing local players in order to bring British player Kevin Richardson and Ireland international John Aldridge to the club, making Atkinson their third foreigner and also the first black player in their history. He was nicknamed El txipiron (The squid) by Sociedad fans during the 1990–91 season. His team did not have a good year, although Atkinson made a good contribution over the season, scoring 12 goals in La Liga. Atkinson was racially abused by opposition fans during his time in Spain.

=== Aston Villa ===
The 23-year-old joined Aston Villa for £1.6 million in July 1991, and formed a strike partnership with Dean Saunders when Saunders arrived from Liverpool a year after Atkinson arrived there from Real Sociedad. The partnership was broken up in 1995 when both players were sold to Turkish clubs – Saunders to Galatasaray and Atkinson to Fenerbahçe for £1.7 million.

On 15 August 1992, Atkinson scored Villa's first ever Premier League goal, an 84th-minute equaliser in a 1–1 away draw against Ipswich Town. His solo goal against Wimbledon in a 3–2 away win on 3 October 1992 won Match of the Day's Goal of the Season award for the 1992–93 season. the first season of the new FA Premier League, when Villa finished runners-up.

Atkinson scored in the 1994 League Cup final win against Manchester United, and scored twice in the semi-finals against Tranmere Rovers (once in the first leg and once in the second).

=== Later career ===
Atkinson missed Villa's departure for a 1994 pre-season tour of South Africa because of what were described as "personal problems." When Ron Atkinson left and was replaced as manager by Brian Little, he fell out of favour. In July 1995, Atkinson arrived in Istanbul to agree a deal with Fenerbahçe S.K. Atkinson failed to settle in Turkey and had loan spells with Metz and Manchester City. Atkinson left the club in 1997 and ended his career with stints in Saudi Arabia and South Korea, finally retiring as a player in 2001.

== International career ==
Atkinson represented the England B side in a friendly 4–1 loss against Republic of Ireland B on 27 March 1990. He scored England's only goal in the game.

== Personal life ==
Following the end of his professional football career, Atkinson returned to Telford where he ultimately lived at Little Dawley. He formed a sports consultancy for clubs, players and agents called "Players Come First", but the business was dissolved in November 2015.

=== Death ===
In his last years, Atkinson experienced heart and kidney problems. He died on 15 August 2016 after being tasered by police near his father's house in Trench, Telford. Police had responded to a call as Atkinson threatened to kill his father, Ernest. Atkinson's older brother Kenroy said "My brother had lost it. He was in a manic state and depressed – out of his mind and ranting. He had a tube in his shoulder for the dialysis and he had ripped it out and was covered in blood. He got dad by the throat and said he was going to kill him. He told dad he had already killed me, our brother Paul and sister Elaine and he had come for him." Officers deployed a taser three times, the first two being ineffective; after being successfully tasered and kicked in the head by a police officer, Atkinson went into cardiac arrest on the way to the Princess Royal Hospital, Telford, where he was pronounced dead at about 03:00. He was 48. The incident was referred to the Independent Police Complaints Commission.

His former manager at Wednesday and Villa, Ron Atkinson, called the incident an "out-and-out tragedy" and noted that Dalian "had terrific ability". Dalian Atkinson's Humanist funeral took place at Telford Crematorium on 19 November 2016, followed by interment of his ashes at Hadley Cemetery.

=== Aftermath ===
In November 2019, one police officer was charged with murder in connection with Atkinson's death; another was charged with assault occasioning actual bodily harm. Both officers were due to stand trial in September 2020 but because of delays caused by the COVID-19 pandemic, the trial was delayed until April 2021.

On 26 April 2021, PC Benjamin Monk, who was charged with murder, pleaded not guilty. On 4 May, prosecutors said that Monk pressed the trigger of the taser for 33 seconds, exceeding the protocol of five seconds, before kicking Atkinson twice in the head after he fell to the ground. The defence barrister of his co-defendant said that the actions were "necessary and reasonable as part of [their] continuing efforts to restrain and detain an unpredictable and threateningly violent man as she perceived him to be".

Monk was found not guilty of murder, but guilty of manslaughter on 23 June 2021. The jury failed to reach a verdict on the other police officer, Mary Ellen Bettley-Smith's, assault charge. On 29 June, Monk was given an eight-year prison sentence. This was the first time in over 30 years that a serving police officer had been convicted of manslaughter in the course of duties. It was later disclosed that Monk had been found guilty of gross misconduct by West Mercia Police in 2011 for not declaring two police cautions in his application to join the police; he had stolen from his previous employer in 1997 and been found drunk in 1999. On 2 July, prosecutors announced that they would seek a retrial in the case of the other officer's assault charge.

On 28 September 2022, Bettley-Smith was cleared of the assault charge. Bettley-Smith was accused of gross misconduct and faced a disciplinary panel held by West Mercia Police in March 2023. After Atkinson had been tasered, he was lying on the ground, and Bettley-Smith hit Atkinson three times with her baton. Bettley-Smith's lawyer said that Bettley-Smith behaved "as she was trained to do", and that "she showed bravery under extreme pressure and was in no way responsible for the tragic outcome."

On 17 March 2023, Bettley-Smith was found guilty of gross misconduct for using excessive force. The tribunal found three initial strikes before Monk kicked Mr Atkinson were "lawful" but it found PC Bettley-Smith decision to then hit him a further three times, after police back-up had arrived was "unnecessary disproportionate and unreasonable". Despite being found guilty of gross misconduct, Bettley-Smith was allowed to keep her job as a police officer.

== Career statistics ==
Appearances and goals by club, season and competition
Club	Season	League			National cup (Note: Includes Copa del Rey, FA Cup, Turkish Cup)		League cup (Note: Includes League Cup)		Europe		Total	
Club	Season	Division	Apps	Goals	Apps	Goals	Apps	Goals	Apps	Goals	Apps	Goals
Real Sociedad	1990–91	La Liga	29	12	2	0	—		1 (Note: Appearances in UEFA Cup)	0	32	12
Aston Villa	1991–92	First Division	0	0	0	0	0	0	—		0	0
Aston Villa	1992–93	Premier League	28	11	0	0	4	2	—		32	13
Aston Villa	1993–94	Premier League	29	8	3	0	8	6	4	1	44	15
Aston Villa	1994–95	Premier League	16	3	0	0	2	3	3	1	21	7
Aston Villa	Total		73	22	3	0	14	11	7	2	97	35
Fenerbahçe	1995–96	1.Lig	24	10	6	0	—		—		30	10
Manchester City (loan)	1996–97	First Division	8	2	0	0	0	0	—		8	2
Career total			134	46	11	0	14	11	8	2	167	59

== Honours ==
Aston Villa

- Football League Cup: 1993–94

Fenerbahçe

- Süper Lig: 1995–96

Individual

- BBC Goal of the Season: 1992–93
