= Tony Daley =

English footballer (born 1967)

Personal information
- Full name: Anthony Mark Daley
- Date of birth: 18 October 1967 (age 59)
- Place of birth: Birmingham, England
- Height: 5 ft 9 in (1.75 m)
- Position: Winger

Youth career
- 1983–1985: Aston Villa

Senior career*
Years	Team	Apps	(Gls)
1985–1994	Aston Villa	233	(31)
1994–1998	Wolverhampton Wanderers	21	(3)
1998–1999	Watford	12	(1)
1999	Walsall	7	(0)
1999–2002	Forest Green Rovers	67	(6)
Total		340	(41)

International career
1985–1986	England Youth	6	(2)
1990	England B	1	(0)
1991–1992	England	7	(0)
- * Club domestic league appearances and goals

Anthony Mark Daley (born 18 October 1967) is an English former footballer, who made the vast majority of his appearances for Aston Villa, playing mainly as a winger, well known for his pace.

== Playing career ==
Daley joined hometown club Aston Villa as an apprentice and made his senior debut, aged 17, on 20 April 1985 in a 2–0 defeat at Southampton. He played for the Midlands club for ten seasons, nine at the highest level, and finished a runner-up in both the 1989–90 and 1992–93 league championships. He also played in their 1994 League Cup final triumph where they defeated Manchester United at Wembley.

He nearly got onto the scoresheet in the 1994 Football League Cup final against Manchester United, but his shot hit the post and was rebounded by Dalian Atkinson, only for Andrei Kanchelskis to block it with a handball for which he was sent off. Dean Saunders converted the penalty and put Villa 3–1 ahead, a scoreline which formed the final result and gave Villa a record fifth League Cup win. Daley collected what would be the only major trophy of his career.

Daley linked up with Graham Taylor again as he finally left Aston Villa for Wolverhampton Wanderers in July 1994 for £1.25 million, but he was plagued with injuries and was only able to manage 21 appearances for the club in four seasons.

He was signed once more by Graham Taylor, now at Watford, in July 1998, on a free transfer. His injury woes continued though and he struggled to get fit, missing the final months as the club won promotion to the Premier League, Daley scoring once in the process against Birmingham City. He was given a free transfer to newly promoted Division 1 side Walsall in June 1999, and after a six-month spell there, he finished his playing career with Conference side Forest Green Rovers, hanging up his boots in July 2002.

Daley's perhaps best known goal came in a First Division game against Everton at Villa Park on 22 October 1988. A spectacular flying volley in a 2–0 win for Villa, the goal quickly – thanks in no small part to the popular football video series 'Goals Galore' – became known as 'Daley's Dazzler' and is also remembered for full-back Chris Price (who supplied the cross) having a little celebration all of his own.

=== International career ===
Daley was first called up to the England squad for a friendly against Czechoslovakia in April 1990. Despite not playing, nor making the final squad for the World Cup, his presence in that England camp meant he was featured in the World in Motion music video. The 24-year-old Daley debuted for England v Poland in Euro 1992 qualifying Group 7. Daley was capped seven times for England between 1991 and 1992 under former club manager Graham Taylor. He made his full debut as a substitute in a vital 1–1 draw in Poland on 13 November 1991 that saw England qualify for 1992 European Championships in Sweden. He was subsequently chosen for the squad at the tournament and played in two of England's three games there, but after the tournament he never played for England again.

== Fitness coaching ==
Upon finishing his career in professional football due to persistent injury, Daley completed a Bachelor of Science degree in Sports and Exercise Science at Coventry University. During this time, he also remained at Forest Green Rovers as their fitness coach and worked with youth players at Aston Villa's academy.

Following his studies, he joined Sheffield United as a fitness and conditioning coach in June 2003 but later quit his post following a row with new manager Bryan Robson on 30 August 2007. He was not out of work for long as he joined former club Wolves in the same role the following month. He remained at Wolves in this role for almost ten years before leaving in May 2017.

In 1995, Daley was the subject of a half-hour documentary. The series Respect was produced and directed by Pogus Caesar for Carlton TV, and featured the likes of Dwight Yorke, John Barnes and Ron Atkinson all paying tribute to the winger.

In March 2020, Daley joined the Lion's Den Gym, Bassett's Pole, as a personal trainer.

== Honours ==
Aston Villa

- Football League Cup: 1993–94
