= Mark Bosnich =

Australian soccer player and sports pundit

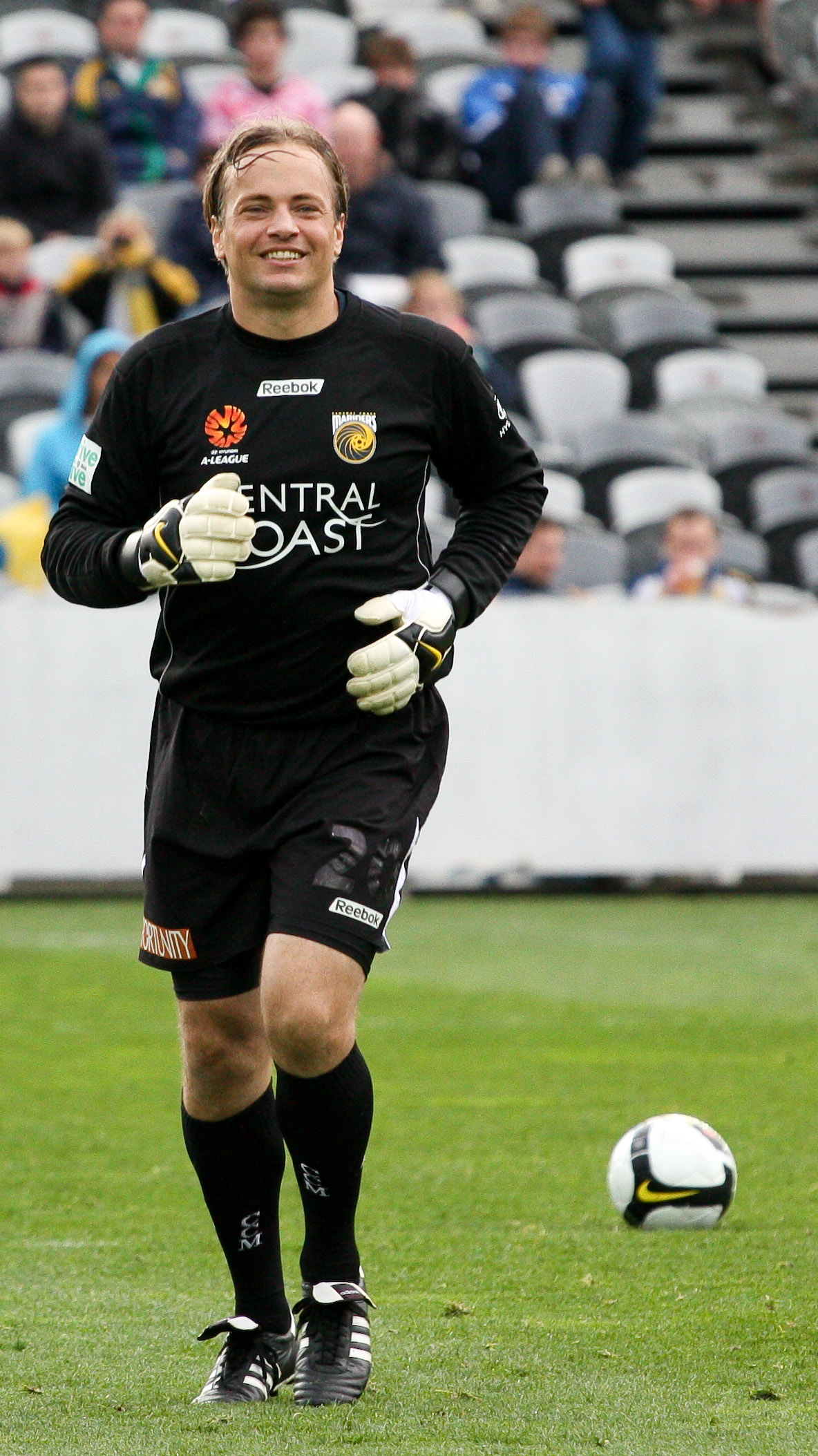
- Bosnich playing for the Central Coast Mariners in 2008

Personal information
- Full name: Mark John Bosnich
- Date of birth: 13 January 1972 (age 54)
- Place of birth: Sydney, New South Wales, Australia
- Height: 1.88 m (6 ft 2 in)
- Position: Goalkeeper

Youth career
- 1988–1989: Sydney Croatia
- 1989–1990: Manchester United

Senior career*
Years	Team	Apps	(Gls)
1990–1991	Manchester United	3	(0)
1991–1992	Sydney United	5	(0)
1992–1999	Aston Villa	179	(0)
1999–2001	Manchester United	23	(0)
2001–2003	Chelsea	5	(0)
2008	Central Coast Mariners	4	(0)
2009	Sydney Olympic	8	(0)
Total		227	(0)

International career
1991	Australia U20	6	(0)
1991–1992	Australia U23	6	(0)
1993–2000	Australia	17	(1)
Medal record
Men's football
Representing Australia
FIFA Confederations Cup
Runner-up	1997 Saudi Arabia
- * Club domestic league appearances and goals

Mark John Bosnich (Croatian: Marko Ivan Bosnić; born 13 January 1972) is an Australian former professional soccer player who played as a goalkeeper, and sports pundit. He played in England for Premier League clubs Aston Villa, Manchester United and Chelsea. He also played in Australia for Sydney United, Central Coast Mariners and Sydney Olympic, as well as representing Australia 17 times during his career, scoring one goal for his nation. He was a co-host of Bill & Boz on Fox Sports News.

Manchester United brought Bosnich to England in 1989, but a lack of first-team opportunities and a failed attempt to secure a work visa, saw him return to Australia. A year later, Aston Villa brought him back to England and he established himself as one of the best goalkeepers in the Premier League during the 1990s. Manchester United re-signed him in 1999 as a replacement for the departing Peter Schmeichel, but injuries and a lack of first-team opportunities led to a decline in form. He left Manchester United for Chelsea in 2001, where he again struggled to find a regular place in the starting line-up and continued to battle with injuries. In September 2002, he was released by Chelsea and banned from football for nine months after testing positive for cocaine.

Bosnich subsequently developed an addiction to the drug and spent the next six years of his life in exile, before training for a comeback in 2007 and eventually making a return to the professional game in his native Australia the following year, before retiring in 2009.

== Club career ==
=== Manchester United (1988–1991) ===
Bosnich was born and raised in Liverpool, southwestern Sydney. His Croatian immigrant father was born in Blato, Korčula, Croatia, and migrated to Sydney in 1959 and his mother is Australian-born to Croatian immigrants. He attended Casula Primary School and later Liverpool Boys High School. Bosnich played for Sydney Croatia youth team before moving to England. In 1989, at the age of 17, he joined Manchester United on a non-contract basis and made his debut for them in a First Division fixture against Wimbledon on 30 April 1990.

He only played two more games for Manchester United before his registration with the club was cancelled on 30 June 1991. Bosnich had been in England using a student visa and when this expired in July 1991, he then returned to Sydney Croatia briefly in the 1991–92 season. He returned to England signing for Aston Villa on a free transfer on 28 February 1992.

=== Aston Villa (1992–1999) ===
Bosnich did not claim a regular place in the Aston Villa first team until the 1993–94 season. In the League Cup semi-final against Tranmere Rovers that season, he dramatically stopped three shots in a penalty shoot-out. Villa won the final, against his former club, Manchester United. In March 1994 Bosnich saved two penalties against Tottenham Hotspur, one from Darren Anderton and one from Nick Barmby, to help secure a 1–1 draw. These were his fourth and fifth penalty saves from open play that season. 1994–95 was Bosnich's first full season as Villa's first-choice goalkeeper, but it was a disappointing season for the club as they narrowly avoided relegation.

Bosnich was one of the few players to be retained by new manager Brian Little following Ron Atkinson's dismissal in November 1994, as the bulk of Atkinson's team was sold off to make way for a new side. 1995–96 was perhaps the best season of Bosnich's career. He was now widely acclaimed as one of the best goalkeepers in the Premier League, as he helped Villa finish fourth in the league and win the Football League Cup final at Wembley with a 3–0 triumph over Leeds United.

In 1996, Bosnich was fined £1,000 and censured by the FA after he was found guilty of misconduct by upsetting fans of Tottenham Hotspur (a club with a large Jewish following) with a Nazi salute. Bosnich spent three more seasons at Villa Park before his contract expired and he joined Manchester United on a free transfer. He had played 207 times in seven and a half years with Villa.

=== Return to Manchester United (1999–2001) ===
Bosnich was signed for Manchester United in the 1999 close season as successor to Peter Schmeichel, signing on a free transfer after his contract at Villa Park expired. During the season, he picked up a Premier League title medal as United were crowned champions by an 18-point margin. That season Bosnich started 23 league games, Raimond van der Gouw started 11 and Massimo Taibi started 4. Highlights of this season were saving two penalties in January 2000; one from Necaxa's Álex Aguinaga in the 2000 FIFA Club World Championship to secure a 1–1 draw, and the other from Middlesbrough's Juninho to help secure a 1–0 win. He also played a key role in Manchester United becoming the first English team to win the Intercontinental Cup in keeping a clean sheet against Palmeiras of Brazil, in Tokyo.

He had one season as United's regular goalkeeper, but then they signed the French World Cup–winning goalkeeper Fabien Barthez in June 2000. Soon after, Bosnich found himself as third-choice goalkeeper. Newly appointed Celtic manager Martin O'Neill made an offer to loan Bosnich for the 2000–01 season, but he decided against the move and decided that he would try to regain his place in the Manchester United first team. He had also fallen out of favour with the national side, losing his spot to Mark Schwarzer. With hopes of a first-team return fading, Bosnich was linked with Chelsea.

In Alex Ferguson's autobiography released in 2013, he called Bosnich a "terrible professional". Bosnich responded to Ferguson, saying, "The fact remains that I was the only player he signed twice at Manchester United. I'm honoured to be mentioned. He's entitled to his view and I'm entitled to mine."

=== Chelsea (2001–2002) ===
Bosnich never played a first-team game for United after the arrival of Fabien Barthez, and on 18 January 2001 he signed for Chelsea on a free transfer. Problems with his fitness and injury meant his debut did not happen until the following season in a UEFA Cup tie against Hapoel Tel Aviv. Bosnich was earning A$130,000-a-week (approximately £45,500-a-week) at Chelsea. He was injured in a league game against Everton in November 2001 and this proved to be his final appearance for the club. His career reached rock-bottom in September 2002 when he failed a drugs test and was subsequently sacked by Chelsea and banned from football for nine months.

=== Exile and return (2002–2007) ===
The suspension scuppered a move to Bolton Wanderers in the newly introduced winter transfer window. Bosnich was keen on the idea of moving to the Reebok Stadium and the player's agent admitted that dialogue had taken place but Sam Allardyce remained coy about his interest. In the autumn of 2004, Bosnich spurned an opportunity to return to football with League One side Walsall, who were then managed by Paul Merson, who had played alongside Bosnich in his final season at Aston Villa.

Bosnich developed a $5,000-a-week cocaine addiction and became a recluse. Bosnich took up to 10 g (0.35 oz) of cocaine a day. At one stage, he almost shot his father with an air rifle, thinking it was an intruder in his home. His father convinced him to quit the drug. In early 2007, former Chelsea teammate and QPR goalkeeping coach Ed de Goey gave him inspiration to come out of retirement. By July 2007, Bosnich started training at Queens Park Rangers' training ground in an attempt to initially get fit, with the view to play professionally again. During the summer he lost 15 kg (33 lb) and claimed to have regained most of his reflexes. In September he kept a clean sheet in goal during a friendly behind closed doors against Barnet, which QPR won 2–0.

=== Australia ===
Bosnich returned to Australia in 2008 after many years living in London. Bosnich was confirmed to be the starting goalkeeper for the Central Coast Mariners for their pre-season cup game against Sydney FC on 27 July 2008. Bosnich kept a clean sheet including saving a penalty by Sydney FC's Steve Corica before being substituted in the 80th minute to a standing ovation by both sets of supporters. On 19 August 2008, Bosnich signed a seven-week guest player deal with the Mariners.

Bosnich made his A-League debut with the Central Coast Mariners on 31 August 2008 in a 4–2 away win against the Queensland Roar at the Suncorp Stadium in Brisbane. Once Mariners first-choice goalkeeper Danny Vukovic had served his suspension, Bosnich did not play again for the Mariners. On 31 May 2009, it was announced that Bosnich had signed to play for Sydney Olympic for the remainder of the NSW Premier League season.

Bosnich suffered a hamstring injury and he ended his playing career to focus on his television commitments. On 22 October 2010, it was confirmed Bosnich would temporarily join the North Queensland Fury as an interim coach for the fixture against Newcastle Jets, in the absence of Franz Straka and Stuart McLaren, who had been banned from the touchline for two games. However, Bosnich was not allowed by the FFA because he did not have a coaching license.

== International career ==
His first appearance with the Australia national team came in 1990 against touring USSR club side Torpedo, followed by a number of further appearances in 'unofficial' Socceroos matches in the next few years. His first full international appearance came in 1993 against New Zealand in a qualifying match for the 1994 FIFA World Cup. Bosnich also appeared for the Socceroos at the 1992 Barcelona Olympics and the 1997 FIFA Confederations Cup.

Although his international appearances with the Socceroos were rare, they were memorable occasions. Keeping for Australia in the away leg of its home-and-away qualifier with Iran in a failed attempt to qualify for the 1998 World Cup, Australia lost on away goals in what Bosnich described as "the lowest moment in Australian football". Bosnich also scored a late penalty for his national team in a 13–0 win over the Solomon Islands. In November 1997 he admitted that he was hopeful of selection for Australia to make up for the times he shunned it in favour of his club commitments. "If I ever get the chance to play for Australia again, I will never make the mistake of saying 'no'."

== Personal life ==
Bosnich married for the first time in 1992, to an English woman named Lisa Hall. The wedding took place in Sydney, New South Wales, in February. It was rumoured that he married Hall to be able to return to Britain, after problems with his working visa. After two years of marriage, Home Office officials were satisfied it was not a wedding of convenience and Bosnich was allowed to remain indefinitely in Britain. However, the marriage ended just three months later. According to him, "We were in love but our marriage just didn't work out." His second marriage was to Sarah Jarrett, in 1999. He almost failed to reach the altar, having only been released on bail hours before the wedding following an incident at a strip club during his stag night celebrations.

The marriage lasted only 14 months. Jarrett was pregnant at the time of the divorce, but she lost the baby soon afterwards, in the third month of pregnancy. Bosnich said that much of his cocaine problem was due to his relationship with British model Sophie Anderton, claiming that for every line of cocaine she had, he had to have one too. He does not regret his actions however, crediting them with being able to help someone in need. His addiction worsened and he later said, "There was a stage where I got up to 10 grams a day when I was really down in the dumps." On 16 July 2008, he was made bankrupt at the High Court in London on the petition of a creditor.

Bosnich provided special comments for the Socceroos' friendly with Nigeria on 17 November alongside Simon Hill on Australia's Fox Sports and subsequently on SBS's coverage of the 2008 FA Cup final. Bosnich is now a football analyst and commentator for Fox Sports football programmes. As part of this role, he co-hosted Bill & Boz which has since been cancelled. In 2021, Bosnich joined Stan Sport to cover the UEFA Champions League, UEFA Europa League and UEFA Europa Conference League competitions. He also works as a player agent. Bosnich trains at Kostya Tszyu's Boxing Academy in Rockdale. Bosnich lived with his parents in Fairfield when he returned to Australia and now lives in Woolloomooloo with his partner Sarah Jones.

== Career statistics ==
=== Club ===
Appearances and goals by club, season and competition
Club	Season	League			National cup		League cup		Continental		Other		Total	
Club	Season	Division	Apps	Goals	Apps	Goals	Apps	Goals	Apps	Goals	Apps	Goals	Apps	Goals
Manchester United	1989–90	First Division	1	0	0	0	0	0	—		—		1	0
Manchester United	1990–91	First Division	2	0	0	0	0	0	0	0	0	0	2	0
Manchester United	Total		3	0	0	0	0	0	0	0	0	0	3	0
Sydney Croatia	1991–92	NSL	5	0	—		—		—		—		5	0
Aston Villa	1991–92	First Division	1	0	0	0	0	0	—		—		1	0
Aston Villa	1992–93	Premier League	17	0	1	0	0	0	—		—		18	0
Aston Villa	1993–94	Premier League	28	0	3	0	8	0	2	0	—		41	0
Aston Villa	1994–95	Premier League	30	0	1	0	3	0	0	0	—		34	0
Aston Villa	1995–96	Premier League	38	0	5	0	8	0	—		—		51	0
Aston Villa	1996–97	Premier League	20	0	3	0	1	0	0	0	—		24	0
Aston Villa	1997–98	Premier League	30	0	4	0	1	0	7	0	—		42	0
Aston Villa	1998–99	Premier League	15	0	0	0	0	0	2	0	—		17	0
Aston Villa	Total		179	0	17	0	42	0	11	0	—		228	0
Manchester United	1999–2000	Premier League	23	0	—		1	0	7	0	4	0	35	0
Manchester United	2000–01	Premier League	0	0	0	0	0	0	0	0	0	0	0	0
Manchester United	Total		23	0	0	0	1	0	7	0	4	0	35	0
Chelsea	2000–01	Premier League	0	0	0	0	0	0	0	0	0	0	0	0
Chelsea	2001–02	Premier League	5	0	0	0	0	0	2	0	0	0	7	0
Chelsea	2002–03	Premier League	0	0	0	0	0	0	0	0	0	0	0	0
Chelsea	Total		5	0	0	0	0	0	2	0	0	0	7	0
Central Coast Mariners	2008–09	A-League	4	0	2	0	—		0	0	—		6	0
Sydney Olympic	2009	NSW Premier League	8	0										
Career total			227	0	19	0	43	0	20	0	4	0	313	0

=== International ===
Scores and results list Australia's goal tally first, score column indicates score after each Bosnich goal.

No.	Date	Venue	Opponent	Score	Result	Competition
1	11 June 1997	Parramatta Stadium, Sydney, Australia	Solomon Islands	13–0	13–0	1998 FIFA World Cup qualification

== Honours ==
Aston Villa

- Football League Cup: 1993–94, 1995–96

Manchester United

- Premier League: 1999–2000
- Intercontinental Cup: 1999

Australia

- FIFA Confederations Cup runner-up: 1997

Individual

- Oceania Footballer of the Year: 1997
- Oceania Goalkeeper of the Century: 1999
