= Matthias Breitkreutz =

German footballer (born 1971)

Personal information
- Date of birth: 12 May 1971 (age 55)
- Place of birth: Crivitz, East Germany
- Height: 1.78 m (5 ft 10 in)
- Position: Midfielder

Youth career
- SG Dynamo Schwerin
- Berliner FC Dynamo

Senior career*
Years	Team	Apps	(Gls)
1988–1989	Berliner FC Dynamo II	2	(0)
1989–1991	SG Bergmann-Borsig	69	(24)
1991–1994	Aston Villa	21	(0)
1994–1996	Hansa Rostock	48	(3)
1996–1998	Arminia Bielefeld	43	(5)
1998–2001	Hansa Rostock	54	(5)
2001–2002	1. FC Saarbrücken	4	(2)
2002–2003	VfB Leipzig	17	(3)
2003	FC Augsburg	8	(0)
Total		266	(42)
- * Club domestic league appearances and goals

Matthias Breitkreutz (born 12 May 1971) is a German former professional footballer who played as a midfielder.

Born in Crivitz, Mecklenburg-Vorpommern, he played during his career for BFC Dynamo, SG Bergmann-Borsig, Aston Villa F.C., FC Hansa Rostock, Arminia Bielefeld, 1. FC Saarbrücken, VfB Leipzig, and FC Augsburg.
