= Kevin Richardson (footballer) =

English footballer (born 1962)

Personal information
- Full name: Kevin Richardson
- Date of birth: 4 December 1962 (age 63)
- Place of birth: Newcastle upon Tyne, England
- Height: 5 ft 7 in (1.70 m)
- Position: Midfielder

Youth career
- Montagu and North Fenham BC
- 1978–1980: Everton

Senior career*
Years	Team	Apps	(Gls)
1980–1986	Everton	109	(16)
1986–1987	Watford	39	(2)
1987–1990	Arsenal	96	(5)
1990–1991	Real Sociedad	37	(0)
1991–1995	Aston Villa	141	(13)
1995–1997	Coventry City	78	(0)
1997–1998	Southampton	28	(0)
1998–2000	Barnsley	30	(0)
2000	→ Blackpool (loan)	11	(1)
2000	Blackpool	9	(0)
Total		578	(40)

International career
1994	England	1	(0)
- * Club domestic league appearances and goals

Kevin Richardson (born 4 December 1962) is an English former footballer who made more than 500 appearances in the Football League and Premier League, playing for Everton, Watford, Arsenal, Aston Villa, Coventry City, Southampton, Barnsley and Blackpool, and also spent a season in La Liga with Real Sociedad. He was capped once for England.

Since retiring, Richardson has worked on the coaching staff of Sunderland, Stockport County, Darlington and Newcastle United in a variety of roles.

== Playing career ==
Richardson was born in Newcastle upon Tyne where he played football for Montagu and North Fenham Boys club. He joined Everton as a schoolboy in 1978 and turned professional in 1980. A versatile midfielder, the young Richardson often had to be content with deputising for the likes of Paul Bracewell, Peter Reid and Kevin Sheedy. However, he still carved out a semi-regular place, and played in the Everton teams that lost the 1984 League Cup final to Liverpool after a replay and won the FA Cup in 1984. He picked up a First Division title medal and a Cup Winners' Cup medal in May 1985. However, he did not make the squad for the FA Cup final, which Everton lost 1–0 to Manchester United.

In 1985–86, he made 18 First Division appearances for the Toffees and scored three goals as they finished runners-up to Liverpool in the league. A week after the title slipped out of Everton's grasp, they lost the FA Cup final 3–1 to Liverpool, but Richardson was not in the squad.

He made 113 appearances in all for the Toffees, scoring 16 goals.

After making one appearance for Everton early in the 1986–87 season, he was sold to Watford for £225,000, helping the Hornets finish ninth in the First Division and reach the semi-finals of the FA Cup.

After one season at Vicarage Road, Richardson was sold to Arsenal for £200,000. Richardson succeeded Graham Rix on the Arsenal left wing, and played in the 1988 League Cup final as Arsenal lost to Luton Town, before moving over to play as a central midfielder for Arsenal's 1988–89 title-winning season to replace Paul Davis. Most notably, Richardson played in Arsenal's dramatic victory at Anfield where they won the title in the last minute of the last game of the season. Now a Championship winner at two different clubs, Richardson continued to be a regular the following season at Arsenal; however, he never totally got on with Gunners manager George Graham and he was transferred to Real Sociedad for £750,000 in the summer of 1990, where he was paired up with new signing Dalian Atkinson and former Liverpool striker John Aldridge. He had made a total of 121 appearances in all competitions for Arsenal, and scored eight goals.

Richardson spent one season in Basque Country before returning to England in the summer of 1991, signing for Ron Atkinson's Aston Villa for £450,000, and was an ever-present in his first two seasons at the club. Richardson became Villa's captain, and led the club to runners-up spot in the inaugural season of the Premier League and victory over Manchester United in the 1994 League Cup final, in which he won the Man of the Match award. In May 1994, when at the height of his success with Villa, he also won his one and only cap for England, in a 5–0 friendly victory over Greece on 17 May 1994.

Atkinson was sacked as Villa manager in November 1994, with the club struggling near the foot of the Premier League, and his successor Brian Little signed midfielder Ian Taylor the following month. Atkinson was appointed manager of Coventry City three months later, and swiftly made Richardson one of his first signings in a £300,000 deal.

Richardson spent the next two and a half years at the Sky Blues repeatedly fending off relegation under both Atkinson and his successor, Gordon Strachan. He left Coventry in September 1997, having scored once in the League Cup against Hull City, and had spells at Southampton, Barnsley and finally Blackpool. Richardson retired from playing in 2000, his career finishing on a low after Blackpool were relegated to Division Three in his final game.

== Coaching career ==
After retirement, Richardson took up coaching. He became youth team manager at Sunderland, and then Carlton Palmer's assistant at Stockport County in 2001. He returned to Sunderland as reserve team coach in 2004 and became first team coach following the club's takeover by a consortium headed by Niall Quinn. Incoming manager Roy Keane initially retained Richardson in this capacity before replacing him with former Manchester United coach Neil Bailey. Richardson then went to Newcastle United's Academy as a team coach. In October 2009 he was appointed as assistant manager to Steve Staunton at Darlington. He was reappointed as a youth team coach at Newcastle, where he coaches the club's under-17 outfit.

== Honours ==
Everton

- Football League First Division: 1984–85
- FA Cup: 1983–84
- FA Charity Shield: 1984, 1986 (shared)
- UEFA Cup Winners' Cup: 1984–85
- Football League Cup runner-up: 1983–84

Arsenal

- Football League First Division: 1988–89
- Football League Centenary Trophy: 1988
- Football League Cup runner-up: 1987–88

Aston Villa

- Football League Cup: 1993–94
