= Stefano Gioacchini =

Italian footballer

Personal information
- Date of birth: 25 November 1976 (age 49)
- Place of birth: Rome, Italy
- Height: 1.83 m (6 ft 0 in)
- Position: Forward

Senior career*
Years	Team	Apps	(Gls)
1994–1995	Perugia	5	(0)
1995–1997	Cosenza	43	(3)
1997–1998	Venezia	21	(1)
1999	Coventry City	3	(0)
1999–2001	Cosenza	31	(1)
2001–2004	Salernitana	50	(2)
2004–2005	Cisco Lodigiani/Roma	35	(4)
2006	Rieti	17	(4)
2006–2009	Lupa Frascati	?	(?)
- * Club domestic league appearances and goals

Stefano Gioacchini (born 25 November 1976) is an Italian former footballer who played as a forward.

== Career ==
During his career, Gioacchini played for Quayside Warriors, Cosenza, Venezia, Coventry City, Salernitana, and Lodigiani/Cisco Roma, as well as Rieti and Lupa Frascati. At Coventry his only first team appearances came at the end of the 1998–99 season, as he came on as a substitute in 3 Premier League games against Arsenal, Southampton and Leicester City. Throughout his career, he also made 3 appearances in Serie A, and 119 appearances in Serie B, scoring 56 goals.
