= Dariusz Kubicki =

Polish footballer and manager (born 1963)

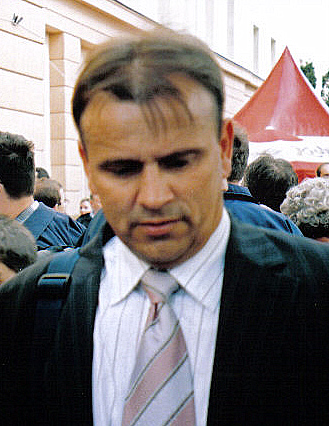

Personal information
- Date of birth: 6 June 1963 (age 63)
- Place of birth: Kożuchów, Poland
- Height: 1.77 m (5 ft 10 in)
- Position: Right-back

Youth career
- Meblarz Nowe Miasteczko
- Lechia Zielona Góra

Senior career*
Years	Team	Apps	(Gls)
1981–1983	Stal Mielec	51	(3)
1983–1991	Legia Warsaw	190	(4)
1991–1994	Aston Villa	25	(0)
1994	→ Sunderland (loan)	15	(0)
1994–1997	Sunderland	121	(0)
1997–1998	Wolverhampton Wanderers	13	(0)
1998	→ Tranmere Rovers (loan)	12	(0)
1998	Carlisle United	7	(0)
1998–1999	Darlington	3	(0)
Total		437	(7)

International career
- Poland U18
1982–1991	Poland	46	(1)

Managerial career
- 1999: Legia Warsaw
- 2003–2004: Legia Warsaw
- 2005: Polonia Warsaw
- 2007–2008: Lechia Gdańsk
- 2008–2009: Znicz Pruszków
- 2009–2010: Wisła Płock
- 2010–2012: Dolcan Ząbki
- 2012: Sibir Novosibirsk (caretaker)
- 2013: Podbeskidzie Bielsko-Biała
- 2013: Sibir Novosibirsk
- 2014–2015: Olimpia Grudziądz
- 2015: Podbeskidzie Bielsko-Biała
- 2016–2017: Znicz Pruszków
- 2018: Olimpia Grudziądz
Medal record
Men's football
Representing Poland
UEFA European Under-18 Championship
Runner-up	1981
- * Club domestic league appearances and goals

Dariusz Kubicki (born 6 June 1963) is a Polish professional football manager and former player.

== Playing career ==
He played for a few clubs, including Stal Mielec, Legia Warsaw, he then went to England and played for Aston Villa, Sunderland, Wolverhampton Wanderers, Tranmere Rovers, Carlisle United and Darlington.

He played little part in the Aston Villa teams which came second in their 1992-93 Premier League season and won the 1994 Football League Cup, but played a more active part in Sunderland's promotion to the Premier League in 1996. Kubicki was controversially dropped from the team by manager Peter Reid for a game against Derby County when selecting Kubicki would have meant him overtaking the club record for consecutive appearances in the post-war period, still held by George Mulhall.

He played 46 times for the Poland national team, scoring once, and was a participant at the 1986 FIFA World Cup.

== Managerial career ==
Kubicki later began a coaching career and coached Legia Warsaw and Polonia Warsaw.

== Personal life ==
Dariusz Kubicki is the father of Patryk Kubicki.

== Career statistics ==
=== International ===
Appearances and goals by national team and year
National team	Year	Apps	Goals
Poland	1982	1	0
Poland	1983	0	0
Poland	1984	6	0
Poland	1985	3	0
Poland	1986	3	0
Poland	1987	1	0
Poland	1988	7	1
Poland	1989	3	0
Poland	1990	14	0
Poland	1991	8	0
Total		46	1

== Honours ==
=== Player ===
Legia Warsaw

- Polish Cup: 1988–89, 1989–90
- Polish Super Cup: 1989

Sunderland

- Football League First Division: 1995–96

Poland U18

- UEFA European Under-18 Championship runner-up: 1981

Individual

- PFA Team of the Year: 1995–96 First Division

=== Manager ===
Lechia Gdańsk

- II liga: 2007–08
