= Graham Fenton =

English footballer and manager

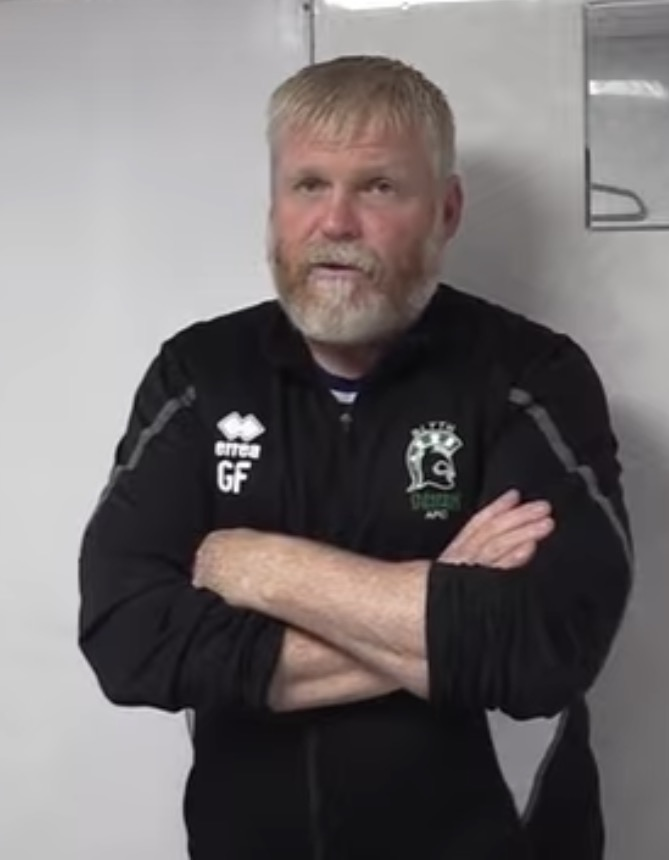
- Graham Fenton with Blyth Spartans under 18s in 2025

Personal information
- Full name: Graham Fenton
- Date of birth: 22 May 1974 (age 52)
- Place of birth: Willington Quay, England
- Height: 5 ft 10 in (1.78 m)
- Position: Striker

Youth career
- 1984-1986: Whitley Bay Boys Club
- 1986-1987: Wallsend Boys Club
- 1987-1990: Cramlington Juniors
- 1990-1992: Aston Villa

Senior career*
Years	Team	Apps	(Gls)
1992–1995	Aston Villa	30	(3)
1994	→ West Bromwich Albion (loan)	7	(3)
1995–1997	Blackburn Rovers	27	(7)
1997–2000	Leicester City	34	(3)
2000	→ Walsall (loan)	9	(1)
2000	Stoke City	5	(1)
2000–2001	St Mirren	26	(2)
2001–2003	Blackpool	15	(5)
2002	→ Darlington (loan)	6	(1)
2003–2009	Blyth Spartans	116	(9)
2009–2010	North Shields	4	(2)
Total		279	(37)

International career
1994	England U21	1	(0)

Managerial career
- 2004: Blyth Spartans (caretaker)
- 2012–2016: North Shields
- 2016–2022: South Shields
- 2022–2023: Blyth Spartans
- * Club domestic league appearances and goals

Graham Anthony Fenton (born 22 May 1974) is an English football manager and former professional footballer who was most recently manager of Blyth Spartans.

He played as a striker in the Premier League for Aston Villa, Blackburn Rovers and Leicester City, as well as in the Football League for West Bromwich Albion, Walsall, Stoke City, Blackpool and Darlington. He also spent a year in Scotland with St Mirren before later playing for non-League Blyth Spartans.

He was capped once by England at under-21 level.

Since retiring from playing he moved into management and has since managed both North Shields, South Shields and Blyth Spartans.

== Club career ==
=== Aston Villa ===
Fenton joined Aston Villa as a trainee in June 1990, turning professional in February 1992. He was loaned out to West Bromwich Albion in January 1994, making his league debut against Leicester City in the same month. His loan spell at Albion was very successful, producing three goals in seven games and contributing to Albion's eventual survival in Division One, leaving many Albion fans "bitterly disappointed" when he did not sign permanently. He instead returned to Villa, making his club debut in a 0–0 Premiership draw at home to Manchester City on 22 February 1994. In March 1994, he played in Villa's League Cup winning side, playing all of the 3–1 victory against Manchester United at Wembley.

=== Blackburn Rovers ===
In November 1995, having struggled to claim a regular place in the Villa Park first team, Fenton made a £1.5 million move to reigning Premiership champions Blackburn, but his first team opportunities were limited as he faced competition from Alan Shearer, Chris Sutton and Kevin Gallacher. He scored seven times for Blackburn, including two as a late substitute against Newcastle United, the team Fenton has supported since childhood, in April 1996, which effectively ended Newcastle's title challenge.

=== Leicester City ===
In August 1997, he moved to Martin O'Neill's Leicester City for a fee of £1.1million. He scored on his Leicester debut, having replaced Ian Marshall as a late substitute in the 2–1 win away to Liverpool, but again struggled to establish himself, making only 34 league appearances (21 as substitute) over three seasons. Despite being left out of Leicester's squad for the 2000 Football League Cup Final he made four appearances and scored one goal during their victorious League Cup campaign. He also scored one of the penalties in the shootout against Fulham in the quarter final.

He joined Walsall on loan in March 2000, scoring once against Port Vale and had an unsuccessful trial with Barnsley in July 2000.

=== Later career ===
In August 2000 he joined Stoke City on a monthly contract, scoring once against Reading, and at the end of the following month, signed for St Mirren on a two-year contract.

In August 2001, Fenton joined Blackpool on a free transfer, but once more struggled to establish himself in the first team. He was an unused substitute for the final as Blackpool won the 2001–02 Football League Trophy. He had a spell on loan with Darlington between September and December 2002, scoring once against Bournemouth, and was one of nine players released by Blackpool manager Steve McMahon in May 2003.

In July 2003, Fenton returned to the North East of England, joining Blyth Spartans. Blyth manager Paul Baker appointed Fenton as player-assistant manager in July 2004. Fenton took over as caretaker-manager of Blyth when Baker left that September, returning to his player-assistant manager role in October 2004 after the appointment of Harry Dunn as manager. In the 2005–06 season he was part of the Spartans' side that gained promotion to the Conference North by winning the Northern Premier League. He was assistant manager and player at North Shields from 2009 until 2012.

== International career ==
Fenton made his only appearance for the England Under-21s on 15 November 1994 in a 1–0 win against Ireland U-21s at St James' Park, the team included several future full internationals, including Sol Campbell and Nicky Butt.

== Managerial career ==
Fenton took over as manager of former Amateur Cup Winners North Shields in April 2012, after previous manager Anthony Woodhouse resigned. Fenton took over with 4 games remaining with the club missing out on promotion from a strong position for the second consecutive season. Two years later, he led North Shields to winning the Northern League Division Two title and promotion to Division One. During the 2014–15 season, Fenton led North Shields to success in the 2015 FA Vase Final, beating Glossop North End 2–1. The following season 2015-16 North Shields beat Blyth Spartans in the Northumberland Senior Cup Final.

On 5 September 2016, Fenton resigned from his role at North Shields and subsequently joined South Shields as a joint manager. During the 2016-17 season, South Shields won a historic quadruple which included the Northern League Division 1, Durham Challenge Cup, Northern League Cup and the FA Vase.

He was sacked by South Shields on 16 January 2022 and replaced by Kevin Phillips.

On 16 August 2022, Fenton returned to Blyth Spartans, signing a two-year deal with the club. Having kept Blyth in the National League North in the previous season, Fenton was dismissed and placed on gardening leave on 28 December 2023.

== Career statistics ==
Club	Season	League			FA Cup		League Cup		Other^{[A]}		Total	
Club	Season	Division	Apps	Goals	Apps	Goals	Apps	Goals	Apps	Goals	Apps	Goals
Aston Villa	1993–94	Premier League	12	1	0	0	1	0	–		13	1
Aston Villa	1994–95	Premier League	14	2	0	0	3	0	–		17	2
Aston Villa	1995–96	Premier League	4	0	0	0	0	0	–		4	0
Aston Villa	Total		30	3	0	0	4	0	0	0	34	0
West Bromwich Albion (loan)	1993–94	First Division	7	3	0	0	0	0	–		7	3
Blackburn Rovers	1995–96	Premier League	14	6	0	0	0	0	–		14	6
Blackburn Rovers	1996–97	Premier League	13	1	1	0	2	0	–		16	1
Blackburn Rovers	Total		27	7	1	0	2	0	0	0	30	7
Leicester City	1997–98	Premier League	23	3	1	0	1	0	2	0	27	3
Leicester City	1998–99	Premier League	9	0	0	0	2	1	–		11	1
Leicester City	1999–2000	Premier League	2	0	3	0	4	1	–		9	1
Leicester City	Total		34	3	4	0	7	2	2	0	47	5
Walsall (loan)	1999–2000	First Division	9	1	0	0	0	0	0	0	9	1
Stoke City	2000–01	Second Division	5	1	0	0	2	0	0	0	7	1
St Mirren	2000–01	Scottish Premier League	26	2	1	0	2	0	0	0	29	2
Blackpool	2001–02	Second Division	15	5	1	0	1	0	3	0	20	5
Blackpool	2002–03	Second Division	0	0	0	0	0	0	0	0	0	0
Blackpool	Total		15	5	1	0	1	0	3	0	20	5
Darlington (loan)	2001–02	Third Division	6	1	0	0	0	0	0	0	6	1
Career Total			159	26	7	0	18	2	5	0	189	28

A. The "Other" column constitutes appearances and goals in the UEFA Cup, Football League play-offs and Football League Trophy.

== Honours ==
=== Player ===
Aston Villa

- Football League Cup: 1993–94

Blackpool

- Football League Trophy: 2001–02

=== Manager ===
North Shields

- FA Vase: 2014–15

South Shields

- FA Vase: 2016–17

Individual

- Aston Villa Young Player of the Year: 1993–94
