= SG Bergmann-Borsig =

SG Bergmann-Borsig-
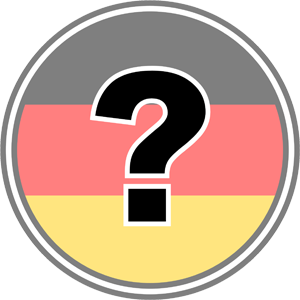
- Full name: Sportgemeinde Bergmann-Borsig e.V.
- Founded: 1946
- Website: https://www.sg-bergmann-borsig.de/
| Home colours | Away colours |

SG Bergmann-Borsig is a German sports club from borough of Pankow, in Berlin. The club has departments in several sports, such as tennis, tabletennis, gymnastics, volleyball, kyudo and ninjutsu.

== History ==
It was established following World War II on 8 April 1946 by handball players from Charlottenburg, Rosenthal and Wilhelmsruh in the city's Pankow district. Located in the Soviet-occupied quarter of Berlin, SG formed a football department that was part of the separate competition that emerged in East Germany. The club became independent of its parent association club in 1990 as Pankower Fußballverein Bergmann-Borsig before failing financially in 1994.

SG was associated with and received financial support from the Bergmann-Borsig energy and metalworks factory. It was renamed Betriebssportgemeinschaft Stahl Wilhelmsruh on 24 August 1950, and following the transition of the factory to the manufacture of machinery and transport equipment in 1952, it became BSG Motor Wilhelmsruh.

The economic importance of the operation helped the Wilhelmsruh club grow quickly and saw the formation of football, hockey, tennis and other departments in the 1950s. A number of top athletes and sports teams were part of the club including tennis player Gerda Riewe, the 1962 East Berlin handball champions, and the 1974 East Berlin women's volleyball champions. The most successful section were the archers, who excelled both nationally and internationally, and who included Rose Marie Grzondziel, seventeen time East German champion. The team was renamed BSG Bergmann-Borsig Berlin in 1972.

== Football in 1956 ==
The football section was founded in 1956 and did not come to note until reaching the highest level city competition in 1975. Bergmann-Borsig won the city championship in 1977 and advanced to the second division DDR-Liga where they would remain a lower-tier side until finally relegated in 1983 following a last place finish.

After five years of mediocre performances in the district city league, BSG enjoyed a successful campaign, capturing both the city cup and regional championship in 1989. East and West Germany were reunited in 1990 and the two separate German football competitions were merged. The footballers left their parent sports club to form a separate side and following their Bezirksliga Berlin title took part in the final season of play in the DDR-Liga in 1989–90, as it became the transitional NOFV-Liga. In this season they served as an effective reserve team for BFC Dynamo, as reserve teams were no longer allowed in the East German league structure.

The next season Bergmann-Borsig's footballers left the parent club to play as Pankower FV Bergmann-Borsig.

They improved their standing to 5th place and qualified to play in the NOFV-Oberliga Nord (IV) where they finished 3rd. That was the height of the club's achievement as they began a gradual descent. FV finished in 14th place in 1994, and like many other former East German sides, ran into financial difficulties, ending in bankruptcy in June of that year. The club briefly merged with SV Preußen Berlin before again becoming an independent side on 1 October 1997 through formation of Weißenseer FC. Parent club SG Bergmann-Borsig is still active today, but no longer has a football department.

== Honours ==
The club's honours:

- Bezirksliga Berlin
  - Champions: 1976, 1980, 1989
