= Shaun Teale =

English footballer & manager

Personal information
- Full name: Shaun Teale
- Date of birth: 10 March 1964 (age 62)
- Place of birth: Southport, England
- Position: Defender

Senior career*
Years	Team	Apps	(Gls)
1983–1988	Southport	112	(6)
1988–1989	Weymouth	100	(4)
1989–1991	AFC Bournemouth	62	(0)
1991–1995	Aston Villa	147	(2)
1995–1998	Tranmere Rovers	54	(0)
1997	→ Preston North End (loan)	5	(0)
1997–1998	→ Happy Valley (loan)	25	(3)
1998–2000	Motherwell	47	(4)
2000	Carlisle United	18	(0)
2000–2002	Southport	68	(5)
2002–2003	Burscough	12	(0)
2003–2004	Northwich Victoria	6	(1)
Total		445+	(16+)

Managerial career
- 2002–2003: Burscough
- 2003–2004: Northwich Victoria
- 2005–2006: Chorley
- * Club domestic league appearances and goals

Shaun Teale (born 10 March 1964) is an English football manager and former professional footballer.

He played as a defender from 1983 until 2004 and was notably part of the League Cup winning team of Aston Villa in 1994.He also played in the Football League for AFC Bournemouth, Tranmere Rovers, Preston North End and Carlisle United, the Scottish Premier League for Motherwell. As well as having a spell in Hong Kong with Sing Tao he has played at a Non-league level for Weymouth, Southport, Burscough and Northwich Victoria before moving into management with the two latter clubs, as well as having a spell in charge of Chorley.

== Playing career ==
He was a central defender who joined AFC Bournemouth from non-league Weymouth for £50,000 in 1989. He spent three seasons at Bournemouth before moving to Aston Villa in July 1991. He helped them finish runners-up in the Premier League in 1993 and win the Football League Cup a year later, before losing his place in the first team to Ugo Ehiogu.

He moved from Villa to join Tranmere Rovers for £500,000 in the summer of 1995. He made his Tranmere debut on 12 August 1995 against Wolves and played in 29 league games for Tranmere in his first season with them. Whilst with Rovers he had loan spells with Preston North End and Sing Tao SC, before signing for Motherwell in August 1998.

Teale moved from Motherwell to Carlisle United on a free transfer in February 2000, playing 20 games for the Cumbrian club. He then went on to join Southport, playing for them until the age of 40, before moving into non-league coaching and management.

== Managerial career ==
Teale was appointed manager of Burscough, a team in the Northern Premier League Premier Division. Whilst he was there, the side won the 2003 FA Trophy, in the final of which he played.

Teale left Burscough six weeks after the Trophy win, and has since managed Northwich Victoria, a Football Conference team in the 2003/04 season. Teale left Northwich at the end of the 2003/04 season.

Between February 2005 and August 2006, Teale managed Northern Premier League First Division side Chorley, before leaving to run his pub and restaurant business in Burscough.

It was announced on 8 March 2013 he applied for Management of AFC Telford United with Peter Withe.

== Personal life ==
The author, Lee Child, a fan of Aston Villa, in his first Jack Reacher novel, Killing Floor (1991), named the character, Grover Teale, Mayor of the fictional Margrave, as a hidden reference to Shaun.

Between 2008 and 2009, Teale was the owner of the Farmer's Arms pub in Burscough. On 3 September 2010, it was announced that Teale had come out of retirement to sign for Southport and District Sunday League Premier Division side The Herald.

In 2023 his autobiography Here, There & Everywhere was published. Written with Rob Carless, this covered his career in football as both a player and a coach.

== Honours ==
Aston Villa

- Football League Cup: 1993–94
