= 1988–89 Aston Villa F.C. season =

English football club season

Aston Villa
1988–89 season
- Chairman: Doug Ellis
- Manager: Graham Taylor
- Stadium: Villa Park
- First Division: 17th
- FA Cup: Fourth round
- League Cup: Fifth round

The 1988–89 English football season was Aston Villa's 90th season in the Football League. Villa competed in the Football League First Division having earned a promotion back to the First Division under their manager Graham Taylor. The team saw a slump in performances towards the end of the season, Aston Villa narrowly avoided relegation after a draw on the final day of the season. There were debuts for Chris Price (111), Derek Mountfield (90), Ian Olney (88), Ian Ormondroyd (56), Nigel Callaghan (26), Lee Butler (8) and Darrell Duffy (1).

The Birmingham City season saw three Second City derbies with Villa. 2nd Division Birmingham were soon to be relegated to the Third Division for the first time in the club's history. Villa would keep a clean sheet in all three matches, putting 13 goals past their local rivals. Drawn in the League Cup 2nd Round, Kevin Gage and Andy Gray would score in the 2–0 victory at St Andrews. In the return leg Villa won 5–0 with goals by Derek Mountfield, Kevin Gage (2), Ian Olney, and Tony Daley. In the 1988-89 Simod Cup 1st Round David Platt, Bernie Gallacher, Derek Mountfield, Alan McInally (2), and Allan Evans contributed to a 6–0 victory.

The start of the season saw Gordon Cowans rejoin Aston Villa in a £250,000 deal, following 3 years at Bari. Striker, Warren Aspinall, left in a £315,000 deal, as Portsmouth manager, Alan Ball, aimed for an immediate return to the First Division.

2 October 1988: Aston Villa sold defender Neale Cooper to Rangers for £300,000.

24 December 1988: Aston Villa sold striker Garry Thompson to Watford for £325,000.

15 April 1989 – Everton beat Norwich City 1–0 in the FA Cup semi-finals at Villa Park. The other semi-final saw one of English football's greatest ever tragedies, with the death of 96 Liverpool supporters, during a match against Nottingham Forest at Hillsborough.

== First Division ==
Pos	Team	Pld	W	D	L	GF	GA	GD	Pts	Qualification or relegation
15	Sheffield Wednesday	38	10	12	16	34	51	−17	42	
16	Luton Town	38	10	11	17	42	52	−10	41	
17	Aston Villa	38	9	13	16	45	56	−11	40	
18	Middlesbrough (R)	38	9	12	17	44	61	−17	39	Relegation to the Second Division
19	West Ham United (R)	38	10	8	20	37	62	−25	38	Relegation to the Second Division

Source: World Football
Rules for classification: 1) Points; 2) Goal difference; 3) Goals scored
(R) Relegated

=== Matches ===
27 August 1988	Aston Villa	2–2	Millwall	Villa Park
	Stuart Gray (pen); Alan McInally	Report
Note: Millwall began their First Division career with a 2–2 draw against Aston Villa at Villa Park.

3 September 1988	Arsenal	2–3	Aston Villa	Highbury
		Report	Alan McInally (2); Andy Gray

10 September 1988	Aston Villa	1–1	Liverpool	Villa Park
	Alan McInally	Report

17 September 1988	West Ham United	2–2	Aston Villa	Boleyn Ground
		Report	Alan McInally (2)

24 September 1988	Aston Villa	1–1	Nottingham Forest	Villa Park
	Kevin Gage	Report

1 October 1988	Sheffield Wednesday	1–0	Aston Villa	Hillsborough Stadium

8 October 1988	Aston Villa	0–1	Wimbledon	Villa Park

15 October 1988	Charlton Athletic	2–2	Aston Villa	The Valley
			Alan McInally; David Platt

22 October 1988	Aston Villa	2–0	Everton	Villa Park
	Tony Daley; David Platt

29 October 1988	Aston Villa	2–1	Tottenham Hotspur	Villa Park
	Own goal; Tony Daley

5 November 1988	Manchester United	1–1	Aston Villa	Old Trafford
			Gordon Cowans
Note: Manchester United drew with Aston Villa at home with a score of 1–1. This was the Manchester United's fifth draw of the season.

12 November 1988	Southampton	3–1	Aston Villa	The Dell
			Tony Daley
Note: After a 3–1 home win over Aston Villa, Southampton achieved their third win of the season.

19 November 1988	Aston Villa	1–2	Derby County	Villa Park
	Derek Mountfield

26 November 1988	Coventry City	2–1	Aston Villa	Highfield Road
			Alan McInally
Note: Coventry's 2–1 home win over local rivals, Aston Villa, saw them jump to fifth place in the table.

3 December 1988	Aston Villa	3–1	Norwich City	Villa Park
	Kevin Gage (2); David Platt
Note: Norwich City remained at the top of the First Division despite a 3–1 defeat to Aston Villa. However, Arsenal sat just three points behind them, with two games still to play.

10 December 1988	Middlesbrough	3–3	Aston Villa	Ayresome Park
			Andy Gray; Alan McInally (2)

17 December 1988	Luton Town	1–1	Aston Villa	Kenilworth Road
			Own goal

26 December 1988	Aston Villa	2–1	Queens Park Rangers	Villa Park
	Alan McInally (2)

31 December 1988	Aston Villa	0–3	Arsenal	Villa Park
Note: After defeating Aston Villa 3–0, Arsenal replaced Norwich City at the top the First Division due to a higher goal difference.

3 January 1989	Liverpool	1–0	Aston Villa	Anfield

14 January 1989	Aston Villa	3–1	Newcastle United	Villa Park
	Andy Gray; Tony Daley; Alan McInally

21 January 1989	Nottingham Forest	4–0	Aston Villa	City Ground

4 February 1989	Aston Villa	2–0	Sheffield Wednesday	Villa Park
	Nigel Callaghan; David Platt

27 March 1989	Queens Park Rangers	1–0	Aston Villa	Loftus Road

1 April 1989	Aston Villa	2–1	Luton Town	Villa Park
	Tony Daley; Ian Olney

8 April 1989	Newcastle United	1–2	Aston Villa	St James' Park
			Stuart Gray; David Platt

22 April 1989	Norwich City	2–2	Aston Villa	Carrow Road
			Ian Olney; Alan McInally

29 April 1989	Aston Villa	1–1	Middlesbrough	Villa Park
	Stuart Gray

2 May 1989	Aston Villa	1–2	Southampton	Villa Park
	Stuart Gray

6 May 1989	Derby County	2–1	Aston Villa	Baseball Ground
			David Platt

13 May 1989	Aston Villa	1–1	Coventry City	Villa Park
	David Platt
Note: Middlesbrough joined already relegated Newcastle United, after losing a relegation showdown 1–0 away to Sheffield Wednesday, whilst Luton Town beat Norwich City 1–0. The result ensured Wednesday's survival. West Ham United, however, had to win their last two games to stay up—at the expense of Aston Villa.

Source: avfchistory.co.uk

== FA Cup ==
Teams from the Football League First and Second Divisions entered in the Third round in the FA Cup played over the weekend 7–8 January 1989. The round featured three clubs from the Football Conference at Step 5 of English football: Welling United, Sutton United and Kettering Town.

Tie no	Home team	Score	Away team	Date
6	Crewe Alexandra (4)	2–3	Aston Villa (1)	7 January 1989

=== Fourth round ===
The fourth round of games were played over the weekend 28–29 January 1989. Sutton United and Kettering Town were again the lowest-ranked teams in the round, and they were also the last non-league clubs left in the competition.

Tie no	Home team	Score	Away team	Date
4	Aston Villa	0–1	Wimbledon	28 January 1989

== League Cup ==
=== Second round ===
Second City Derby
- 44--32--26

First leg

Home team	Score	Away team	Date
Birmingham City	0–2	Aston Villa	27 September 1988

Second leg

Home team	Score	Away team	Date	Agg
Aston Villa	5–0	Birmingham City	12 October 1988	7–0
