= 1987–88 Aston Villa F.C. season =

English football club season

Aston Villa
1987–88 season
- Chairman: Doug Ellis
- Manager: Graham Taylor
- Stadium: Villa Park
- Second Division: 2nd (promoted)
- FA Cup: Fourth round
- League Cup: Fourth round

Second City Derby
- 41--32--26

The 1987–88 English football season was Aston Villa's 89th season in the Football League. Villa competed in the Football League Second Division and at their first attempt won promotion back to the top flight under manager, Graham Taylor.

Taylor had been appointed at the end of the previous season. Former Villa manager, Dick Taylor was instrumental in bringing him to the club. While playing for Scunthorpe, Dick had struck-up a strong friendship with Graham's father and always kept an eye on Tommy Taylor's lad's career. It was Dick who sent a letter to Villa chairman Doug Ellis indicating that Graham was open to facing the challenge of managing a major club. Dick's influential recommendation immediately placed Graham Taylor apart from the "has-beens, up-and-comers, and no-chance merchants that apply for every managerial vacancy".

Second-tier football was a terrible setback for Aston Villa. Taylor was given the brief to let the players know that he meant business and to get the club back into the First Division at the first attempt. Taylor called a meeting to introduce himself to the players. He asked them collectively if any of them had "any problems, any complaints, any desire to leave the club, anything at all they wished to discuss...Everything must be out in the open to start as they meant to go on." There was silence and Taylor repeated the question with similar response. He then turned to defender Tony Dorigo, saying "Well I understand that Chelsea want to sign you and that you want to go..." Dorigo had to meekly agree that this was the case and everyone learnt it would not be easy to pull the wool over Graham Taylor's eyes.

In the Pre-season Chelsea signed Dorigo for £475,000, the fee helped finance relatively inexpensive replacements. In November Villa boosted their Second Division promotion quest with a £150,000 move for Crystal Palace midfielder Andy A Gray. There were also debuts for Kevin Gage, Alan McInally, Stuart Gray, David Platt, Malcolm Allen, Mark Lillis, David Hunt, Steve Sims, and Gareth Williams. On 31 December 1987, Graeme Souness signs Aston Villa midfielder Mark Walters for Rangers for £550,000.

Post season, on 26 May 1988, Aston Villa prepared for their First Division comeback by signing Derek Mountfield from Everton for £425,000 and Chris Price from Blackburn Rovers for £150,000.

== League table ==
Pos	Team	Pld	W	D	L	GF	GA	GD	Pts	Relegation
1	Millwall (C, P)	44	25	7	12	72	52	+20	82	Promotion to the First Division
2	Aston Villa (P)	44	22	12	10	68	41	+27	78	Promotion to the First Division
3	Middlesbrough (O, P)	44	22	12	10	63	36	+27	78	Qualification for the Second Division play-offs
4	Bradford City	44	22	11	11	74	54	+20	77	Qualification for the Second Division play-offs
5	Blackburn Rovers	44	21	14	9	68	52	+16	77	Qualification for the Second Division play-offs

Rules for classification: 1) Points; 2) Goal difference; 3) Goals scored
(C) Champions; (O) Play-off winners; (P) Promoted

=== Matches ===
15 August 1987	Ipswich Town	1–1	Aston Villa	Portman Road
		Report	Own goal 29'
Note: Steve Sims, David Hunt, Kevin Gage make their Debuts.

22 August 1987	Aston Villa	0–2	Birmingham City	Villa Park
		Report

29 August 1987	Hull City	2–1	Aston Villa	Boothferry Park
		Report	Warren Aspinall 29' (pen)

31 August 1987	Aston Villa	1–1	Manchester City	Villa Park
	Kevin Gage 40'	Report
Note: Plymouth and Barnsley lead the way on goal difference, but fancied Villa are fourth from bottom.

5 September 1987	Leicester City	0–2	Aston Villa	Filbert Street
		Report	Mark Walters 39'; Mark Lillis 62'

8 September 1987	Aston Villa	0–1	Middlesbrough	Villa Park
		Report

12 September 1987	Aston Villa	0–0	Barnsley	Villa Park
		Report

16 September 1987	West Bromwich Albion	0–2	Aston Villa	The Hawthorns
		Report	Warren Aspinall 14', 90'

19 September 1987	Huddersfield Town	0–1	Aston Villa	Leeds Road
		Report	Steve Hunt 19'

26 September 1987	Aston Villa	1–1	Sheffield United	Villa Park
	Kevin Gage 21'	Report

30 September 1987	Aston Villa	1–1	Blackburn Rovers	Villa Park
	Warren Aspinall 6'	Report

3 October 1987	Plymouth Argyle	1–3	Aston Villa	Home Park
		Report	Mark Walters 2', 39'; Mark Lillis 9'

10 October 1987	Leeds United	1–3	Aston Villa	Elland Road
		Report	Own goal 26'; Warren Aspinall 49', 55'

17 October 1987	Aston Villa	1–1	Bournemouth	Villa Park
	Mark Walters 10'	Report

21 October 1987	Aston Villa	4–1	Crystal Palace	Villa Park
	Mark Walters 2', 26', 88' (pen); Steve Hunt 74'	Report

24 October 1987	Stoke City	0–0	Aston Villa	Victoria Ground
		Report

31 October 1987	Aston Villa	2–1	Reading	Villa Park
	Andy Blair 64'; Mark Lillis 78'	Report
Note: Aston Villa now stand fourth, with Ipswich Town and Birmingham City close behind.

3 November 1987	Shrewsbury Town	1–2	Aston Villa	Gay Meadow
		Report	Martin Keown 7'; Warren Aspinall 50'

7 November 1987	Aston Villa	1–2	Millwall	Villa Park
	Martin Keown 25'	Report

14 November 1987	Oldham Athletic	0–1	Aston Villa	Boundary Park
		Report	Alan McInally 36'

28 November 1987	Bradford City	2–4	Aston Villa	Valley Parade
		Report	Stuart Gray (2); Paul Birch; Garry Thompson
Note: Middlesbrough and Bradford City are level at the top of the Second Division on 43 points. Aston Villa, Hull City and Crystal Palace occupy the play-off places.

5 December 1987	Aston Villa	2–1	Swindon Town	Villa Park
	Garry Thompson (2)	Report

12 December 1987	Birmingham City	1–2	Aston Villa	St Andrew's
		Report	Garry Thompson (2)

18 December 1987	Aston Villa	0–0	West Bromwich Albion	Villa Park
		Report

26 December 1987	Sheffield United	1–1	Aston Villa	Bramall Lane
		Report	Garry Thompson 65'

28 December 1987	Aston Villa	1–1	Huddersfield Town	Villa Park
	Paul Birch 30'	Report
Note: Middlesbrough lead with a one-point margin over Bradford City. A four-point margin separates their nearest six challengers – Aston Villa, Crystal Palace, Millwall, Hull City, Manchester City and Ipswich Town.

1 January 1988	Aston Villa	5–0	Hull City	Villa Park
	Stuart Gray; Warren Aspinall (2); Andy Gray; Alan McInally	Report

2 January 1988	Barnsley	1–3	Aston Villa	Oakwell
		Report	Warren Aspinall; Paul Birch; Alan McInally
Note: 11 Jan 1988 – Dave Bassett is sacked after just six months in charge of Watford, who are currently bottom of the First Division. He is succeeded by Aston Villa assistant manager Steve Harrison.

16 January 1988	Aston Villa	1–0	Ipswich Town	Villa Park
	Martin Keown	Report

23 January 1988	Manchester City	0–2	Aston Villa	Maine Road
		Report	Tony Daley; Garry Thompson
Note: 26 Jan 1988 – Aston Villa boost their Second Division promotion challenge with the £200,000 acquisition of highly rated Crewe Alexandra midfielder David Platt, 21. 31 Jan 1988 – Aston Villa have crept to the top of the Second Division, while Crystal Palace have risen to second place. Middlesbrough, Millwall and Blackburn Rovers occupy the play-off zone, while Bradford City have slid from second to sixth place in the space of a few weeks. Leicester City, relegated from the First Division last season, are now in the Second Division relegation play-off places.

6 February 1988	Aston Villa	2–1	Leicester City	Villa Park
	Mark Lillis; Allan Evans	Report

14 February 1988	Middlesbrough	2–1	Aston Villa	Ayresome Park
		Report	Tony Daley

20 February 1988	Blackburn Rovers	3–2	Aston Villa	Ewood Park
		Report	David Platt; Garry Thompson

27 February 1988	Aston Villa	5–2	Plymouth Argyle	Villa Park
	Stuart Gray (pen); David Platt; Paul Birch (2); Garry Thompson	Report
Note: The Second Division promotion race sees Aston Villa and Blackburn Rovers level at the top of the table, with Millwall, Middlesbrough and Bradford City occupying the play-off places.

5 March 1988	Bournemouth	1–2	Aston Villa	Dean Court
		Report	Tony Daley; David Platt

12 March 1988	Aston Villa	1–2	Leeds United	Villa Park
	Alan McInally	Report

19 March 1988	Reading	0–2	Aston Villa	Elm Park
		Report	Paul Birch; Garry Thompson

26 March 1988	Aston Villa	0–1	Stoke City	Victoria Ground
		Report
Note: Aston Villa remain top of the Second Division with a two-point margin over Blackburn Rovers, with the play-off places being occupied by Middlesbrough, Millwall and Bradford City. Leeds United, Crystal Palace and Stoke City remain in strong contention for promotion as well.

2 April 1988	Millwall	2–1	Aston Villa	The Den
		Report	Garry Thompson

4 April 1988	Aston Villa	1–2	Oldham Athletic	Villa Park
	Stuart Gray	Report

9 April 1988	Crystal Palace	1–1	Aston Villa	Selhurst Park
		Report	David Platt

23 April 1988	Aston Villa	1–0	Shrewsbury Town	Villa Park
	Warren Aspinall	Report
Note: 30 Apr 1988 – The promotion issues in the Second Division have yet to be confirmed, with just four points separating the top five clubs – Millwall, Aston Villa, Bradford City, Middlesbrough and Blackburn Rovers.

2 May 1988	Aston Villa	1–0	Bradford City	Villa Park
	David Platt	Report

7 May 1988	Swindon Town	0–0	Aston Villa	County Ground
		Report

Source: avfchistory.co.uk

== FA Cup ==
=== Third round ===
Teams from the Football League First and Second Divisions entered in this round. The third round of games in the FA Cup were played over the weekend 9–11 January 1988, with the first set of replays being played on 12–13 January. Three games went to second replays and one of these to a third replay. Yeovil Town was again the lowest-ranked team in the draw, while Macclesfield Town, Maidstone United, Sutton United, Bath City and Yeovil were the last non-league clubs left in the competition.

Tie no	Home team	Score	Away team	Date
29	Leeds United (2)	1–2	Aston Villa (2)	9 January 1988

=== Fourth round ===
The fourth round of games were played over the weekend 30 January – 1 February 1988, with replays being played on 3 February. A second replay was then played on 9 February. Holders Coventry City were eliminated by Watford. Fourth Division side Leyton Orient was the lowest-ranked team in the draw.

Tie no	Home team	Score	Away team	Date
2	Aston Villa	0–2	Liverpool	31 January 1988

== League Cup ==
=== Second round ===
First leg

Home team	Score	Away team	Date
Middlesbrough	0–1	Aston Villa	23 September 1987

Second leg

Home team	Score	Away team	Date	Agg.
Aston Villa	1–0	Middlesbrough	7 October 1987	2–0

=== Third round ===
Home team	Score	Away team	Date
Aston Villa	2–1	Tottenham Hotspur	28 October 1987
