= 1986–87 Aston Villa F.C. season =

English football club season

Aston Villa
1986–87 season
- Chairman: Doug Ellis
- Manager: Graham Turner (until 14 September); Ron Wylie (caretaker until 22 September); Billy McNeill
- Stadium: Villa Park
- First Division: 22nd (relegated)
- FA Cup: Third round
- League Cup: Fourth round

The 1986–87 English football season was Aston Villa's 88th season in the Football League. The 1986–87 Football League First Division season saw Aston Villa relegated. Manager, Graham Turner, was sacked on 14 September 1986, just over two years after his appointment, as Villa lost five of their first six matches. Billy McNeill, manager of Manchester City, quit that month to take charge of Villa. When Villa were relegated, after finishing bottom of the First Division in May 1987, McNeill stood down and was replaced by Graham Taylor. Manchester City were also relegated that season.

On 1 Aug 1986 Turner signed midfielder Neale Cooper from Aberdeen for £350,000. There were also debuts under Turner for Garry Thompson, Martin Keown, and under McNeil for Phil Robinson, Mark Burke, Bernie Gallacher and Stuart Ritchie.

23 Dec 1986 – Tottenham Hotspur sign midfielder Steve Hodge from Aston Villa for £650,000. 19 Feb 1987 – Billy McNeill boosts Aston Villa's battle against relegation by paying Everton £300,000 for striker Warren Aspinall.

On 8 May, relegated Aston Villa sacked Billy McNeill after eight months as manager. Two weeks later, Graham Taylor resigns after 10 years as Watford manager to succeed him. Villa begin rebuilding following relegation with the sale of defender Tony Dorigo to Chelsea for £450,000.

== League ==
Pos	Team	Pld	W	D	L	GF	GA	GD	Pts	Qualification or relegation
18	Oxford United	42	11	13	18	44	69	−25	46	
19	Charlton Athletic (O)	42	11	11	20	45	55	−10	44	Qualification for the Second Division play-offs
20	Leicester City (R)	42	11	9	22	54	76	−22	42	Relegation to the Second Division
21	Manchester City (R)	42	8	15	19	36	57	−21	39	Relegation to the Second Division
22	Aston Villa (R)	42	8	12	22	45	79	−34	36	Relegation to the Second Division

Source: World Football
Rules for classification: 1) Points; 2) Goal difference; 3) Goals scored
(O) Play-off winners; (R) Relegated

=== Matches ===
23 August 1986	Aston Villa	0–3	Tottenham Hotspur	Villa Park
		Report

26 August 1986	Wimbledon	3–2	Aston Villa	Plough Lane
		Report	Allan Evans (pen), Garry Thompson

30 August 1986	Queens Park Rangers	1–0	Aston Villa	Loftus Road
		Report
Note: The bottom two places in the league were occupied by Manchester United and Aston Villa, who are yet to gain a point this season.

3 September 1986	Aston Villa	2–1	Luton Town	Villa Park
	Paul Kerr (45', 46')	Report

6 September 1986	Aston Villa	1–2	Oxford United	Villa Park
	Simon Stainrod (pen)	Report

13 September 1986	Nottingham Forest	6–0	Aston Villa	City Ground
		Report
Note: Bryan Robson made his first league appearance since April to help Manchester United record their first league win of the season at the fifth attempt as they beat Southampton 5–1 at Old Trafford and climb off the bottom of the First Division. Nottingham Forest go top with a 6–0 home win over Aston Villa. Aston Villa sack manager Graham Turner after just over two years at the helm.

20 September 1986	Aston Villa	1–4	Norwich City	Villa Park
	Simon Stainrod	Report
Note: Newly promoted Norwich go second with a 4–1 win at Aston Villa. A nine-goal thriller at Leeds Road sees Huddersfield beat Oldham 5–4 in the Second Division.

27 September 1986	Liverpool	3–3	Aston Villa	Anfield
		Report	Steve Hodge, Garry Thompson, Allan Evans (pen)
Note: Aston Villa's first league match under Billy McNeill ends in a 3–3 draw with Liverpool at Anfield after the hosts come from behind twice to equalise. Aston Villa still occupy bottom place and Manchester United are second from bottom with just four points so far this campaign.

4 October 1986	Coventry City	0–1	Aston Villa	Highfield Road
		Report	Garry Thompson

11 October 1986	Aston Villa	3–1	Southampton	Villa Park
	Paul Elliott (2), Allan Evans (pen)	Report

18 October 1986	Watford	4–2	Aston Villa	Vicarage Road
		Report	Mark Walters, Simon Stainrod

25 October 1986	Aston Villa	2–0	Newcastle United	Villa Park
	Steve Hodge (2)	Report
Note: As October ends, Manchester United and Aston Villa have both climbed out of the bottom two, ahead of Newcastle United, Manchester City and Chelsea.

1 November 1986	Aston Villa	2–0	Leicester City	Villa Park
	Simon Stainrod (2)	Report

8 November 1986	Manchester City	3–1	Aston Villa	Maine Road
		Report	Tony Daley

15 November 1986	Aston Villa	0–0	Chelsea	Villa Park
		Report

22 November 1986	West Ham United	1–1	Aston Villa	Boleyn Ground
		Report	Garry Thompson

29 November 1986	Aston Villa	0–4	Arsenal	Villa Park
		Report
Note: Arsenal remain top with a 4–0 away win over Aston Villa.

6 December 1986	Sheffield Wednesday	2–1	Aston Villa	Hillsborough Stadium
		Report	Allan Evans (pen)
Note:

13 December 1986	Aston Villa	3–3	Manchester United	Villa Park
	Steve Hodge, Garry Thompson, Allan Evans (pen)	Report
Note: Villa come from 3–1 down in the final minutes to draw 3–3 with Manchester United in a First Division clash at Villa Park.

20 December 1986	Oxford United	2–2	Aston Villa	Manor Ground
		Report	Garry Thompson, Mark Walters

26 December 1986	Aston Villa	2–0	Charlton Athletic	Villa Park
	Paul Birch, Tony Daley	Report

27 December 1986	Chelsea	4–1	Aston Villa	Stamford Bridge
		Report	Paul Elliott
Note: Chelsea halt their dismal form with a 4–1 home win over Aston Villa.

1 January 1987	Everton	3–0	Aston Villa	Goodison Park
		Report
Note: Arsenal remain four points ahead at the top of the First Division with a 3–1 home win over Wimbledon, as Everton keep up the pressure with a 3–0 home win over Aston Villa.

3 January 1987	Aston Villa	0–0	Nottingham Forest	Villa Park
		Report

24 January 1987	Tottenham Hotspur	3–0	Aston Villa	White Hart Lane
		Report
Note: Tottenham gain 3–0 home win over Aston Villa. Villa have slipped back into the relegation zone, joining Leicester City and Newcastle United.

7 February 1987	Aston Villa	0–1	Queens Park Rangers	Villa Park
		Report

14 February 1987	Luton Town	2–1	Aston Villa	Kenilworth Road
		Report	Allan Evans (pen)

21 February 1987	Aston Villa	2–2	Liverpool	Villa Park
	Own goal, Paul Elliott	Report
Note: Liverpool miss the chance to go level on points at the top of the First Division when they are held to a 2–2 draw at Aston Villa.

28 February 1987	Norwich City	1–1	Aston Villa	Carrow Road
		Report

4 March 1987	Aston Villa	0–0	Wimbledon	Villa Park
		Report
Note: Aston Villa miss the chance to climb out of the bottom four after Wimbledon hold them to a goalless draw at Villa Park.

7 March 1987	Newcastle United	2–1	Aston Villa	St James' Park
		Report
Note: Newcastle stay bottom of the table but boost their survival hopes with a 2–1 home win over an Aston Villa side who are now second from bottom.

21 March 1987	Southampton	5–0	Aston Villa	The Dell
		Report
Note: The latest relegation crunch thriller sees Southampton beat Aston Villa 5–0 at The Dell.

25 March 1987	Aston Villa	1–1	Watford	Villa Park
	Steve Hunt 81'	Report
Note: Aston Villa drop two more points in their survival battle. Leicester climb out of the bottom four with a 4–1 home win over QPR. Newcastle remain bottom after drawing 1–1 at home to Tottenham.

28 March 1987	Aston Villa	1–0	Coventry City	Villa Park
		Report
Note: Manchester City crash to the bottom of the table with a 4–0 defeat against Leicester City at Filbert Street, which is a major boost for the home side's survival hopes. Aston Villa boost their own survival bid with a 1–0 home win over Coventry City. Newcastle climb off the bottom of the table with a 2–0 home win over Southampton.

4 April 1987	Aston Villa	0–0	Manchester City	Villa Park
		Report
Note: First Division strugglers Aston Villa and Manchester City draw 0–0 at Villa Park. Newcastle's survival hopes are given a fresh boost as they beat Leicester City 2–0 at home. A seven-goal thriller at Selhurst Park sees Charlton beat Watford 4–3 to boost their survival bid.

11 April 1987	Leicester City	1–1	Aston Villa	Filbert Street
		Report	Mark Walters 62'

18 April 1987	Aston Villa	0–1	Everton	Villa Park
		Report
Note: Everton move closer to winning the First Division title with a 1–0 away win over Aston Villa, who are six points adrift of the relegation playoff place and seven points adrift of automatic survival with five games remaining.

20 April 1987	Charlton	3–0	Aston Villa	Selhurst Park
		Report
Note: A relegation crunch game at Selhurst Park sees Charlton boost their survival hopes by winning 3–0 against Aston Villa, whose survival hopes are left hanging by a thread.

25 April 1987	Aston Villa	4–0	West Ham United	Villa Park
	Steve Hunt, Warren Aspinall (2), Simon Stainrod	Report
Note: Comprehensive victories for the bottom two of Aston Villa and Manchester City keeps the survival hopes of both clubs alive.

2 May 1987	Arsenal	2–1	Aston Villa	Highbury
		Report	Warren Aspinall
Note: Aston Villa are left needing at least four points from their final two games after losing 2–1 to Arsenal at Highbury.

4 May 1987	Aston Villa	1–2	Sheffield Wednesday	Villa Park
	Phil Robinson	Report
Note: Aston Villa's relegation is confirmed as they lose 2–1 at home to Sheffield Wednesday.

9 May 1987	Manchester United	3–1	Aston Villa	Old Trafford
		Report	Paul Birch

Source: avfchistory.co.uk

== FA Cup ==
Teams from the Football League First and Second Divisions entered in the Third round. Most of the third round of games in the FA Cup were played over the weekend 10–11 January 1987, however various matches and replays were played as late as 31 January. Holders Liverpool were eliminated by Luton Town. Caernarfon Town was again the lowest-ranked team in the round, while Caernarfon, Maidstone United and Telford United were the last non-league clubs left in the competition.

Tie no	Home team	Score	Away team	Date
4	Aston Villa (1)	2–2	Chelsea (1)	10 January 1987
Replay	Chelsea	2–1	Aston Villa	21 January 1987

== League Cup ==
=== Second round ===
First leg

Home team	Score	Away team	Date
Reading	1–1	Aston Villa	24 September 1986

Second leg

Home team	Score	Away team	Date	Agg
Aston Villa	4–1	Reading	8 October 1986	5–2

=== Last 32 ===
Home team	Score	Away team	Date
Derby County	1–1	Aston Villa	29 October 1986

Replays

Home team	Score	Away team	Date
Aston Villa	2–1	Derby County	4 November 1986

=== Last 16 ===
Home team	Score	Away team	Date
Southampton	2–1	Aston Villa	18 November 1986

== Deaths ==
2 Apr 1987 – Former Aston Villa and Wales midfielder Trevor Hockey dies of a heart attack at the age of 43 after collapsing during a charity football match in West Yorkshire.
