= Neale Cooper =

Scottish footballer and manager (1963–2018)

Personal information
- Full name: Neale James Cooper
- Date of birth: 24 November 1963
- Place of birth: Darjeeling, West Bengal, India
- Date of death: 28 May 2018 (aged 54)
- Place of death: Aberdeen, Scotland
- Height: 6 ft 1 in (1.85 m)
- Position: Midfielder

Youth career
- 1978–1979: King Street
- 1979–1980: Aberdeen

Senior career*
Years	Team	Apps	(Gls)
1980–1986	Aberdeen	133	(6)
1986–1988	Aston Villa	20	(0)
1988–1990	Rangers	17	(1)
1990–1991	Reading	7	(0)
1991–1996	Dunfermline Athletic	103	(3)
1996–1996	Ross County	5	(0)
Total		285	(10)

International career
1981–1985	Scotland U21	13	(0)
1983	Scotland U19		

Managerial career
- 1996–2002: Ross County
- 2003–2005: Hartlepool United
- 2005: Gillingham
- 2008–2011: Peterhead
- 2011–2012: Hartlepool United
- * Club domestic league appearances and goals

Neale James Cooper (24 November 1963 – 28 May 2018) was a Scottish football player and coach. He played as a midfielder during the 1980s and 1990s, most prominently for the Aberdeen team managed by Alex Ferguson, and later played for Aston Villa, Rangers, Reading, Dunfermline Athletic and Ross County. Cooper then became a coach, and worked as a manager in England with Hartlepool United (twice) and Gillingham, and in Scotland with Ross County and Peterhead.

== Playing career ==
Born in Darjeeling, India, Cooper attended Airyhall Primary School and Hazlehead Academy in Aberdeen and began his senior career with Aberdeen, the team he had supported as a boy. A first-team regular from the beginning of the 1981–82 season, he starred in midfield for the Dons for five seasons in which he won two Premier Division championships, four Scottish Cups, one League Cup, the 1983 European Cup Winners' Cup and the European Super Cup under the management of Alex Ferguson. Having initially moved into a flat in Aberdeen as a young player, Cooper was 'persuaded' by Ferguson to return to his mother's home to help ensure that Cooper was shielded from the obvious temptations arising from youthful independence.

In the summer of 1986, he signed for Aston Villa. Cooper made only twenty league appearances in the next two years, partly because of injuries. In the 1988–89 season, he transferred to Rangers but injuries restricted him to only seventeen league appearances and he failed to make a single first team appearance in the 1990–91 season – instead, he was restricted to sixteen appearances in the reserves, the final one coming against Motherwell on 30 March 1991

In 1991, Cooper signed for Reading, where he linked up with his former Aberdeen teammate Mark McGhee. Cooper made seven league appearances in a brief stint with Reading, before he moved to Dunfermline Athletic. At Dunfermline he was able to play regularly, helping them win promotion to the Premier Division in 1995–96 (having lost to his former club Aberdeen in the play-off a year earlier).

Despite his success at club level and a prominent role in the national age-group teams including at the 1983 FIFA World Youth Championship, he never gained a full cap for Scotland, a fact which surprised many.

== Managerial career ==
=== Ross County ===
In 1996, Cooper moved into management with Ross County. He guided the Staggies through two successful promotion campaigns climbing from the fourth to the second tier, before stepping down after a run of only one win in eleven games.

=== Hartlepool United ===
After a break from the game, Cooper was appointed manager of Hartlepool United. Pools had been promoted from the bottom tier of English football to Division Two for the third time in their history, but manager Mike Newell had been sacked. He was a surprise choice of chairman Ken Hodcroft, but Cooper's strong Aberdeen links, with Pools owners IOR Ltd based in the Scottish city, helped his cause. Hodcroft was impressed by Cooper from their first encounter. Upon appointment, Cooper joked "I've come from Ross County, which is somewhere up near Iceland".

His first game in charge of Hartlepool was a memorable 4–3 opening day of the season win at Peterborough United – with four new signings all getting on the scoresheet, creating history in the process. Cooper described it as "One of the most emotional games of football I've ever been involved in" after his new side came back from 3–1 down to win.

That momentum carried Hartlepool forward, coupled with Cooper's charisma and touchline passion. New signing Marco Gabbiadini made an impact before he was forced to retire. Another new striking recruit Paul Robinson scored a hat-trick in a Friday night 8–1 thumping of Grimsby Town at Victoria Park. Cooper then drove back home to Aberdeen to be with his family after the game.

Cooper's touchline manner meant he was an instant hit with the Hartlepool crowd and that season he led the team to their highest-ever league finish – sixth in Division Two. They also took over 10,000 fans to the Stadium of Light – the biggest away attendance at Sunderland's ground – for an FA Cup third round tie.

Hartlepool secured a play-off spot after a 1–1 draw at Swindon Town on the final day. Both teams only needed a point to make the play-offs and Hartlepool took on Bristol City. Hartlepool drew 1–1 at home, before losing 2–1 in the second-leg, conceding two late goals after Antony Sweeney had headed Hartlepool in front.

The next season, Hartlepool again finished sixth. Cooper's side embarked on a 12-game unbeaten run at the turn of the year with Adam Boyd and Joel Porter irresistible up front. But Pools won only 3 of 12 games, including a 4–6 home loss to Wrexham. And after a home defeat by Walsall, Cooper was controversially removed from his post, with just one league game to go. Hodcroft later said that the manager was struggling on a number of personal fronts with his family and children back in Aberdeen.

Cooper's assistant Martin Scott took temporary command and Cooper's players made the play-off final, losing 4–2 to Sheffield Wednesday after extra time.

=== Gillingham ===
Three weeks after leaving Hartlepool, he took over the reins at Gillingham. Cooper resigned in November of that year after poor performances in the league and an FA Cup defeat to Northern Premier League side Burscough.

=== Peterhead ===
In October 2006, Cooper returned to Scottish football with Second Division Peterhead, as he took on the role of first team coach under the management of Steve Paterson. When Paterson left Peterhead in early 2008, Cooper took over as manager. Peterhead narrowly missed out on the end of season playoffs for a place in the Scottish First Division in 2008 finishing 5th, however he guided the Blue Toon to fourth place the following season and a playoff against Airdrie United. Peterhead struggled in the following season, however, and Cooper left the club in March 2011 with them sitting bottom of the Second Division table.

=== Hartlepool United ===
On 28 December 2011, Cooper was reappointed as manager of League One club Hartlepool United. In Neale's third game as manager, Pools managed to end their poor run of home form with a 2–0 win against Rochdale. Cooper brought numerous talented young players into the Hartlepool first team with seven teenagers from the club's academy making their debuts. – including Luke James.

After a 3–2 defeat on the final day to league champions Charlton Athletic, he guided them to a 13th-place finish in the 2011–12 season, their highest league finish since he was last in charge at The Vic. After a poor run of form at the start of the 2012–13 season and unable to halt the slide, Cooper resigned as Hartlepool boss in late October after a defeat at relegation rivals Bury.

=== Ross County ===
On 23 November 2012, Cooper was appointed assistant manager of Ross County, by now a Scottish Premier League side, alongside Derek Adams. Cooper left Ross County at the end of the 2013–14 season.

== Personal life ==
In November 2017, Cooper was one of four inductees into the Aberdeen Hall of Fame.

His son Alex played in Liverpool youth academy, after a £100,000 move from Ross County in December 2007. Alex spent the summer of 2006 at a training camp in Switzerland with Chelsea, and Jose Mourinho had reportedly tracked his development. He was released by Liverpool in 2011 and has since played first team football for several clubs, mainly in Scotland.

== Death ==
On 28 May 2018 it was reported that Cooper was in a critical condition after being found collapsed in a stairwell of flats in Aberdeen. He died later that day, aged 54.

A public memorial event and celebration of Cooper's life was held at Aberdeen's ground Pittodrie Stadium on 8 June 2018. The evening was attended by his family, former teammates and fans and saw over 4,000 people attend.

In June, his former club Hartlepool United announced that they would be renaming a stand in his honour. The Neale Cooper Stand, formerly the Mill House Stand, was officially unveiled in a pre-season game against Sunderland in July.

== Career statistics ==
=== Appearances and goals by club, season and competition ===
Club	Season	League			National Cup		League Cup		Europe		Other		Total	
Club	Season	Division	Apps	Goals	Apps	Goals	Apps	Goals	Apps	Goals	Apps	Goals	Apps	Goals
Aberdeen	1978–79	Scottish Premier Division	0	0	0	0	0	0	0	0	-	-	0	0
Aberdeen	1979–80	Scottish Premier Division	0	0	0	0	0	0	0	0	-	-	0	0
Aberdeen	1980–81	Scottish Premier Division	6	0	1	0	0	0	1	0	-	-	8	0
Aberdeen	1981–82	Scottish Premier Division	27	3	5	1	8	1	6	0	-	-	46	5
Aberdeen	1982–83	Scottish Premier Division	31	2	5	1	7	0	9	0	-	-	52	3
Aberdeen	1983–84	Scottish Premier Division	26	0	6	1	8	0	9	0	-	-	49	1
Aberdeen	1984–85	Scottish Premier Division	20	1	5	0	0	0	2	0	-	-	27	1
Aberdeen	1985–86	Scottish Premier Division	23	0	5	0	4	0	6	0	-	-	38	0
Aberdeen	Total		133	6	27	3	27	1	33	0	-	-	220	10
Aston Villa	1986–87	First Division	13	0	2	1	0	0	0	0	-	-	15	1
Aston Villa	1987–88	Second Division	7	0	0	0	0	0	-	-	-	-	7	0
Aston Villa	1988–89	First Division	0	0	0	0	0	0	0	0	-	-	0	0
Aston Villa	Total		20	0	2	1	0	0	0	0	-	-	22	1
Rangers	1988–89	Scottish Premier Division	14	1	2	0	1	0	0	0	-	-	17	1
Rangers	1989–90	Scottish Premier Division	3	0	0	0	0	0	0	0	-	-	3	0
Rangers	Total		17	1	2	0	1	0	0	0	-	-	20	1
Reading	1991–92	Third Division	7	0	0	0	2	0	-	-	-	-	9	0
Reading	Total		7	0	0	0	2	0	-	-	-	-	9	0
Dunfermline Athletic	1991–92	Scottish Premier Division	21	0	2	0	0	0	-	-	-	-	23	0
Dunfermline Athletic	1992–93	Scottish First Division	33	1	0	0	2	0	-	-	-	-	35	1
Dunfermline Athletic	1993–94	Scottish First Division	30	2	0	0	0	0	-	-	-	-	30	2
Dunfermline Athletic	1994–95	Scottish First Division	15	0	1	0	2	0	-	-	-	-	18	0
Dunfermline Athletic	1995–96	Scottish First Division	4	0	0	0	1	0	-	-	1	0	6	0
Dunfermline Athletic	Total		103	3	3	0	5	0	-	-	1	0	112	3
Ross County	1996–97	Scottish Third Division	4	0	0	0	1	0	-	-	-	-	5	0
Ross County	1997–98	Scottish Third Division	1	0	0	0	0	0	-	-	-	-	1	0
Ross County	1998–99	Scottish Third Division	0	0	0	0	0	0	-	-	-	-	0	0
Ross County	Total		5	0	0	0	1	0	-	-	-	-	6	0
Career total			285	10	34	4	36	1	33	0	1	0	389	15

== Managerial statistics ==
Team	From	To	Record				
Team	From	To	G	W	D	L	Win %
Ross County	1 July 1996	11 November 2002	299	130	89	80	43.48
Hartlepool United	26 June 2003	4 May 2005	110	48	26	36	43.64
Gillingham	21 May 2005	15 November 2005	22	7	5	10	31.82
Peterhead	10 January 2008	22 March 2011	143	50	39	54	34.97
Hartlepool United	28 December 2011	24 October 2012	40	7	14	19	17.50
Total			614	242	173	199	39.41

== Honours ==
=== Player ===
Aberdeen

- Scottish Premier Division: 1983–84, 1984–85
- Scottish Cup: 1981–82, 1982–83, 1983–84, 1985–86
- Scottish League Cup: 1985–86
- European Cup Winners Cup: 1983
- European Super Cup: 1983

Rangers

- Scottish League Cup: 1988–89

Dunfermline Athletic

- Scottish Football League First Division: 1996

=== Manager ===
Ross County

- Scottish Football League Third Division: 1998–99
- Scottish Football League Second Division promotion: 1999–2000

Individual

- Football League One Manager of the Month: January 2005
