= An Impossible Job =

- Cutting Edge episode
- VHS cover
- Episode no.: Season 5 Episode 1
- Directed by: Ken McGill
- Written by: Patrick Collins
- Narrated by: Mark Halliley
- Editing by: Dave Simpson; Justin Annandale
- Production code: Chrysalis Sport
- Original air date: 24 January 1994
- Running time: 50 minutes

Episode chronology
← Previous "Undercover"	Next → "The Club"

"Graham Taylor: An Impossible Job" is a 1994 British fly-on-the-wall documentary directed and produced by Ken McGill, written by Patrick Collins, and made by Chrysalis for Cutting Edge. The documentary follows the England football team through the 18 months before their failure to qualify for the 1994 FIFA World Cup Finals and showed the pressure manager Graham Taylor was under before his resignation. It was originally broadcast by Channel 4 on 24 January 1994.

== Background ==
Neil Duncanson (who joined Chrysalis as a freelance producer in 1991) suggested the documentary, though some of his colleagues believed they would never get permission. The title of the film, An Impossible Job, reflects the difficulties of the England manager's position.

In 2013, journalist Rob Shepherd revealed, "None of us in the 'Hack Pack' who followed England at the time knew that a documentary was being filmed. But Graham Taylor did."

Before England's match against the Netherlands, the Dutch FA had denied access to the crew filming Taylor, but the England manager helped to smuggle them inside the De Kuip stadium.

== Synopsis ==
The documentary follows Graham Taylor before, during and after England's crucial qualifier against the Netherlands in Rotterdam.

England's campaign started poorly with a home draw against Norway in October 1992.

In October 1993, during the penultimate match in the Netherlands, referee Karl-Josef Assenmacher did not send off Ronald Koeman for fouling Platt.

== Appearances ==
- Graham Taylor (England manager)
- Phil Neal (England assistant manager)
- Lawrie McMenemy (England assistant coach)
- Fred Street (England physiotherapist)
- Charles Hughes (The Football Association Director of Coaching)
- Rob Shepherd (Today journalist)
- David Platt
- Paul Gascoigne
- Carlton Palmer
- Ian Wright
- Paul Ince
- Nigel Clough
- Les Ferdinand
- Paul Merson

== Broadcast and release ==
The film was broadcast by Channel 4 on 24 January 1994 as part of the Cutting Edge documentary series. A censored version of the film was broadcast a few days later. More than six million people tuned in to watch the film.

A 77-minute version of the film including previously unseen footage was released on VHS on 7 July 1997 retitled Graham Taylor: "Do I Not Like That. The Final Chapter". North One (which now owns Chrysalis) sold the documentary to ITV who broadcast the extended version of the documentary on 5 October 2008 on ITV4.

== Aftermath ==
The 2001 comedy feature film Mike Bassett: England Manager was inspired partly by Graham Taylor and An Impossible Job.

In 2013, Ken McGill told BBC Sport, "I found it hard to take the consequences of the film. But there is nothing I would change. It is a piece of honest film-making."

== Reception ==
The Daily Express called it "A fascinating mix of black comedy and personal tragedy."

101 Great Goals said in 2008, "...the documentary is a super watch... Above all, it explains much about the pressure of being the England manager. It does also make you wonder how Graham Taylor is now a respected pundit."

The Guardian reported in 2010, "An Impossible Job was immediately hailed as a comic masterpiece". Daniel Taylor of The Guardian in 2013 described it as "a piece of television gold." David Elkin of Pulp Football in the same year said, "The documentary is a brilliant examination of the media, the pressure and the utterly ludicrous nature of being the England national team manager." He added: An Impossible Job gives a real insight into the doomed campaign and the nature of the role."

Barney Ronay in his 2010 book The Manager: The absurd ascent of the most important man in football said, [Taylor] "turned out to be a brilliantly absorbing subject for a tragicomic documentary film." Andy Mitten in his 2003 book The Rough Guide to Cult Football said, "the programme's enduring legacy is to present him [Taylor] unfairly as a provincial buffoon."

== Awards ==
Year	Award	Category	Recipient(s)	Result
1995	Royal Television Society	Best Sports Coverage	Cutting Edge	Won

== See also ==
- 1994 FIFA World Cup qualification (UEFA)
- England national football team manager
- List of association football films
- List of sports films
