= Garry Thompson (footballer, born 1959) =

English footballer and manager

Personal information
- Full name: Garry Lindsey Thompson
- Date of birth: 7 October 1959 (age 67)
- Place of birth: Kings Heath, Birmingham England
- Height: 6 ft 1 in (1.85 m)
- Position: Forward

Youth career
- –1977: Coventry City

Senior career*
Years	Team	Apps	(Gls)
1977–1983	Coventry City	134	(38)
1983–1985	West Bromwich Albion	91	(39)
1985–1986	Sheffield Wednesday	36	(7)
1986–1988	Aston Villa	60	(17)
1988–1990	Watford	34	(8)
1990–1991	Crystal Palace	20	(3)
1991–1993	Queens Park Rangers	19	(1)
1993–1995	Cardiff City	43	(5)
1995–1997	Northampton Town	50	(6)
Total		487	(124)

International career
1981–1982	England U21	6	(3)

Managerial career
- 2001: Bristol Rovers (caretaker)
- 2001–2002: Bristol Rovers
- 2004: Brentford (caretaker)
- * Club domestic league appearances and goals

Garry Lindsey Thompson (born 7 October 1959) is an English former professional footballer and manager who made over 480 appearances in the Football League, most notably for Coventry City, West Bromwich Albion and Aston Villa. After his retirement as a player, Thompson moved into coaching and management.

== Playing career ==
A forward, Thompson had a long playing career and club level, making 487 appearances and scoring 124 goals in the Premier League and throughout the Football League. His peak years were earlier in his career with Coventry City, for whom he scored 49 goals in 158 appearances and West Bromwich Albion, for whom he was voted the club's 1984–85 Player of the Year.

Garry Thompson transferred to Aston Villa for £450,000 in June 1986. The 26-year-old made his debut in the opening match of the season, a 3-0 home defeat to Spurs, becoming the 637th player to represent the club. He scored in the next match, a consolation goal in the 3-2 defeat to Wimbledon at Plough Lane. He made 73 appearances, scoring 19 goals and 8 assists before his final game, a 3-1 defeat at Derby's Baseball Ground in the 1988-89 season.

Late in the 1989–90 season Thompson joined Crystal Palace to provide cover for the injured Ian Wright, but was cup-tied for the 1990 FA Cup Final. He was a part of the 1990–91 Full Members' Cup-winning squad. Thompson briefly played in the Premier League for Queens Park Rangers during the 1992–93 season and made one European appearance for Cardiff City in September 1993. Thompson retired at the end of the 1996–97 season and finished his career with 584 appearances and 153 goals.

== Managerial and coaching career ==
=== Bristol Rovers ===
Thompson began his coaching career while still a player at Northampton Town and later moved to Bristol Rovers as a coach and reserve team manager. In January 2001, after the sacking of manager Ian Holloway, he was named in caretaker charge and managed the first team until the end of the 2000–01 Second Division season and was unable to prevent the Gas' relegation to the Third Division. Thompson became assistant to new manager Gerry Francis in June 2001 and after Francis' resignation in December 2001, he took over the role as permanent manager on a 2 1/2-year contract. By 9 April 2002 and with a double relegation into non-League football looking likely, Thompson was sacked.

=== Brentford ===
In October 2002, Thompson was named as assistant to manager Wally Downes at Second Division club Brentford. He continued in the role until 15 March 2004, when, with the prospect of relegation looming, Downes was sacked. Thompson was named caretaker manager and his one match in charge resulted in a 1–1 draw with Blackpool the following night. He left the club following the appointment of Martin Allen on 18 March.

=== Farnborough Town ===
Thompson served as a coach at struggling Conference Premier club Farnborough Town during the 2004–05 season and quit the club on 31 March 2005.

=== Hucknall Town ===
In February 2006, Thompson joined Conference North club Hucknall Town as assistant to manager Kevin Wilson. He was released from his contract in December 2006.

== Personal life ==
Thompson is of Saint Kitts and Nevis descent. His younger brother Keith was also a professional footballer and he is the uncle of athlete Daniel Caines. Thompson is an Aston Villa supporter and has worked in PR, as a driver and as a summariser for BBC Radio WM. He released an autobiography, Don't Believe a Word, in December 2020.

== Career statistics ==
=== Player ===
Appearances and goals by club, season and competition
Club	Season	League			FA Cup		League Cup		Europe		Other		Total	
Club	Season	Division	Apps	Goals	Apps	Goals	Apps	Goals	Apps	Goals	Apps	Goals	Apps	Goals
Coventry City	1977–78	First Division	6	2	0	0	0	0	—		—		6	2
Coventry City	1978–79	First Division	20	8	2	0	1	1	—		—		23	9
Coventry City	1979–80	First Division	17	6	0	0	0	0	—		—		17	6
Coventry City	1980–81	First Division	35	8	4	1	7	6	—		—		46	15
Coventry City	1981–82	First Division	36	10	3	2	2	0	—		—		41	15
Coventry City	1982–83	First Division	22	4	2	1	3	0	—		—		27	5
Coventry City	Total		134	38	11	4	13	7	—		—		158	49
West Bromwich Albion	1982–83	First Division	12	7	—		—		—		—		12	7
West Bromwich Albion	1983–84	First Division	37	14	4	1	4	3	—		—		45	18
West Bromwich Albion	1984–85	First Division	42	20	1	0	5	2	—		—		48	22
West Bromwich Albion	Total		91	39	5	1	9	5	—		—		105	45
Sheffield Wednesday	1985–86	First Division	36	7	5	1	3	0	—		—		44	8
Aston Villa	1986–87	First Division	31	6	2	0	4	1	—		1 (Note: Appearance in Full Members' Cup)	0	38	7
Aston Villa	1987–88	Second Division	24	11	2	0	1	1	—		1	0	28	12
Aston Villa	1988–89	First Division	5	0	—		1	0	—		1	0	7	0
Aston Villa	Total		60	17	4	0	6	2	—		3	0	73	19
Watford	1988–89	Second Division	21	7	6	0	—		—		0	0	27	7
Watford	1989–90	Second Division	13	1	2	0	1	0	—		0	0	16	1
Watford	Total		34	8	8	0	1	0	—		0	0	43	8
Crystal Palace	Total		20	3	0	0	1	1	—		1	0	22	5
Queens Park Rangers	1991–92	First Division	15	1	0	0	3	2	—		1	0	19	1
Queens Park Rangers	1992–93	Premier League	4	0	0	0	2	0	—		0	0	6	0
Queens Park Rangers	Total		19	1	0	0	5	3	—		1	0	25	1
Cardiff City	Total		43	5	7	1	2	0	1	0	8	3	61	9
Northampton Town	1996–97	Third Division	1	0	0	0	0	0	—		0	0	1	0
Northampton Town	Total		50	6	0	0	2	0	—		1	0	53	6
Career total			487	124	40	7	42	19	1	0	14	3	584	153

=== Manager ===
Team	From	To	Record					Ref
Team	From	To	P	W	D	L	Win %	Ref
Bristol Rovers (caretaker)	29 January 2001	27 June 2001	23	7	5	11	30.4	
Bristol Rovers	24 December 2001	9 April 2002	24	7	5	12	29.2	
Brentford (caretaker)	15 March 2004	18 March 2004	1	0	1	0	0.0	
Total			48	14	11	23	29.2	—

== Honours ==
Aston Villa

- Football League Second Division second-place promotion: 1987–88

Crystal Palace

- Full Members' Cup: 1990–91

Individual

- West Bromwich Albion Player of the Year: 1984–85
