= 1989–90 Football League First Division =

1989–90 season of Football League First Division

Football League First Division
- Season: 1989–90
- Champions: Liverpool; 18th English title
- Relegated: Sheffield Wednesday; Charlton Athletic; Millwall
- European Cup Winners' Cup: Manchester United
- UEFA Cup: Aston Villa
- Matches: 380
- Goals: 986 (2.59 per match)
- Top goalscorer: Gary Lineker (24 goals)
- Biggest home win: Liverpool 9–0 Crystal Palace (12 September 1989)
- Biggest away win: Coventry City 1–6 Liverpool (5 May 1990)
- Highest scoring: Liverpool 9–0 Crystal Palace (12 September 1989); Southampton 6–3 Luton Town (25 November 1989)

The 1989–90 season was the 91st completed season of The Football League.

== Overview ==
=== Season summary ===
Liverpool overhauled a greatly improved Aston Villa side to win their 18th league championship trophy and their fifth major trophy in as many seasons under Kenny Dalglish’s management. Having won their 18th title overall, and their 11th in 17 season, this title turned out to mark the end of their domestic dominance of English football in the 1970s and 1980s - they would not win the title again until the 2019–20 Premier League season, 30 years later. (Note: Liverpool would not win the league again for thirty years after this season, as rivals Manchester United came to dominate domestic football, winning thirteen titles between 1993 and 2013, and surpassing Liverpool's record for domestic league titles. Liverpool would, however, win two UEFA Champions Leagues, one UEFA Europa League and one FIFA Club World Cup, in addition to a number of domestic cup competitions in the interim.) Gary Lineker’s arrival at Tottenham Hotspur saw the North Londoners occupy third place after a season of improvement. Defending champions Arsenal finished fourth, while newly promoted Chelsea finished an impressive fifth. Everton briefly topped the league in late autumn but were unable to maintain their title challenge into the second half of the season and finished sixth. Seventh placed Southampton enjoyed their highest finish for five years, while Wimbledon continued to thrive on limited resources and low crowds to finish eighth.

Nottingham Forest won the League Cup for the second successive season, but finished ninth in the league one year, having finished third during the previous two seasons.

Manchester United's season began well with a 4–1 win over defending champions Arsenal, but they were soon struggling in the league and finished a disappointing 13th in a season dominated by the collapse of Michael Knighton's takeover bid and continued calls from the fans for manager Alex Ferguson to be sacked. The season ended on a high note with a win over Crystal Palace in the FA Cup final - the club's first major trophy under Ferguson's management.

Newly promoted Manchester City secured survival back in the First Division with a 14th-place finish, having replaced Mel Machin as manager with Howard Kendall during the first half of the season.

Luton Town stayed up on goal difference at the expense of Sheffield Wednesday, while Charlton’s four-year spell in the First Division came to an end at the beginning of May. Millwall were rooted to the bottom of the division despite briefly topping the league in September, as they won just two more games in the league after their brief lead of the table vanished.

After the generally good behaviour of England fans at the World Cup in Italy, the ban on English clubs in European competitions was lifted for the 1990–91 season. Liverpool, who were present at the Heysel disaster which had prompted the ban in 1985, were denied a place in the European Cup, but runners-up Aston Villa entered the UEFA Cup and FA Cup winners Manchester United entered the European Cup Winners' Cup.

=== Managerial changes ===
Team	Outgoing manager	Manner of departure	Date of vacancy	Position in table	Incoming manager	Date of appointment
Manchester City	(England) Mel Machin	Sacked	27 November 1989	19th	(England) Tony Book (caretaker)	29 November 1989
Queens Park Rangers	(England) Trevor Francis	Sacked	27 November 1989	18th	(England) Don Howe	29 November 1989
Manchester City	(England) Tony Book	End of caretaker spell	5 December 1989	20th	(England) Howard Kendall	6 December 1989
Luton Town	(England) Ray Harford	Mutual consent	3 January 1990	19th	(Scotland) Jim Ryan	11 January 1990
Millwall	(Scotland) John Docherty	Sacked	13 February 1990	20th	(England) Bob Pearson	14 February 1990
Millwall	(England) Bob Pearson	Demoted to chief scout	16 April 1990	20th	(Scotland) Bruce Rioch	16 April 1990

=== First Division maps ===
Locations of the Football League First Division 1989–90 teams
Locations of the 8 Football League First Division London teams 1989–90, the largest contingent ever from London

== League table ==
Pos	Team	Pld	W	D	L	GF	GA	GD	Pts	Qualification or relegation
1	Liverpool (C)	38	23	10	5	78	37	+41	79	Disqualified from the European Cup (Note: Liverpool were banned by UEFA from its competitions from the season 1985–86 on for 10 years, because of the Heysel Stadium disaster in 1985, involving Liverpool fans. The ban was eventually lifted for the 1991–92 season.)
2	Aston Villa	38	21	7	10	57	38	+19	70	Qualification for the UEFA Cup first round
3	Tottenham Hotspur	38	19	6	13	59	47	+12	63	
4	Arsenal	38	18	8	12	54	38	+16	62	
5	Chelsea	38	16	12	10	58	50	+8	60	
6	Everton	38	17	8	13	57	46	+11	59	
7	Southampton	38	15	10	13	71	63	+8	55	
8	Wimbledon	38	13	16	9	47	40	+7	55	
9	Nottingham Forest	38	15	9	14	55	47	+8	54	
10	Norwich City	38	13	14	11	44	42	+2	53	
11	Queens Park Rangers	38	13	11	14	45	44	+1	50	
12	Coventry City	38	14	7	17	39	59	−20	49	
13	Manchester United	38	13	9	16	46	47	−1	48	Qualification for the European Cup Winners' Cup first round (Note: Manchester United qualified for the UEFA Cup Winners' Cup as the 1989–90 FA Cup winners.)
14	Manchester City	38	12	12	14	43	52	−9	48	
15	Crystal Palace	38	13	9	16	42	66	−24	48	
16	Derby County	38	13	7	18	43	40	+3	46	
17	Luton Town	38	10	13	15	43	57	−14	43	
18	Sheffield Wednesday (R)	38	11	10	17	35	51	−16	43	Relegation to the Second Division
19	Charlton Athletic (R)	38	7	9	22	31	57	−26	30	Relegation to the Second Division
20	Millwall (R)	38	5	11	22	39	65	−26	26	Relegation to the Second Division

Source: World Football
Rules for classification: 1) Points; 2) Goal difference; 3) Goals scored
(C) Champions; (R) Relegated

== Results table ==
Home \ Away	ARS	AST	CHA	CHE	COV	CRY	DER	EVE	LIV	LUT	MCI	MUN	MIL	NWC	NOT	QPR	SHW	SOU	TOT	WDN
Arsenal		0–1	1–0	0–1	2–0	4–1	1–1	1–0	1–1	3–2	4–0	1–0	2–0	4–3	3–0	3–0	5–0	2–1	1–0	0–0
Aston Villa	2–1		1–1	1–0	4–1	2–1	1–0	6–2	1–1	2–0	1–2	3–0	1–0	3–3	2–1	1–3	1–0	2–1	2–0	0–3
Charlton Athletic	0–0	0–2		3–0	1–1	1–2	0–0	0–1	0–4	2–0	1–1	2–0	1–1	0–1	1–1	1–0	1–2	2–4	1–3	1–2
Chelsea	0–0	0–3	3–1		1–0	3–0	1–1	2–1	2–5	1–0	1–1	1–0	4–0	0–0	2–2	1–1	4–0	2–2	1–2	2–5
Coventry City	0–1	2–0	1–2	3–2		1–0	1–0	2–0	1–6	1–0	2–1	1–4	3–1	1–0	0–2	1–1	1–4	1–0	0–0	2–1
Crystal Palace	1–1	1–0	2–0	2–2	0–1		1–1	2–1	0–2	1–1	2–2	1–1	4–3	1–0	1–0	0–3	1–1	3–1	2–3	2–0
Derby County	1–3	0–1	2–0	0–1	4–1	3–1		0–1	0–3	2–3	6–0	2–0	2–0	0–2	0–2	2–0	2–0	0–1	2–1	1–1
Everton	3–0	3–3	2–1	0–1	2–0	4–0	2–1		1–3	2–1	0–0	3–2	2–1	3–1	4–0	1–0	2–0	3–0	2–1	1–1
Liverpool	2–1	1–1	1–0	4–1	0–1	9–0	1–0	2–1		2–2	3–1	0–0	1–0	0–0	2–2	2–1	2–1	3–2	1–0	2–1
Luton Town	2–0	0–1	1–0	0–3	3–2	1–0	1–0	2–2	0–0		1–1	1–3	2–1	4–1	1–1	1–1	2–0	1–1	0–0	1–1
Manchester City	1–1	0–2	1–2	1–1	1–0	3–0	0–1	1–0	1–4	3–1		5–1	2–0	1–0	0–3	1–0	2–1	1–2	1–1	1–1
Manchester United	4–1	2–0	1–0	0–0	3–0	1–2	1–2	0–0	1–2	4–1	1–1		5–1	0–2	1–0	0–0	0–0	2–1	0–1	0–0
Millwall	1–2	2–0	2–2	1–3	4–1	1–2	1–1	1–2	1–2	1–1	1–1	1–2		0–1	1–0	1–2	2–0	2–2	0–1	0–0
Norwich City	2–2	2–0	0–0	2–0	0–0	2–0	1–0	1–1	0–0	2–0	0–1	2–0	1–1		1–1	0–0	2–1	4–4	2–2	0–1
Nottingham Forest	1–2	1–1	2–0	1–1	2–4	3–1	2–1	1–0	2–2	3–0	1–0	4–0	3–1	0–1		2–2	0–1	2–0	1–3	0–1
Queens Park Rangers	2–0	1–1	0–1	4–2	1–1	2–0	0–1	1–0	3–2	0–0	1–3	1–2	0–0	2–1	2–0		1–0	1–4	3–1	2–3
Sheffield Wednesday	1–0	1–0	3–0	1–1	0–0	2–2	1–0	1–1	2–0	1–1	2–0	1–0	1–1	0–2	0–3	2–0		0–1	2–4	0–1
Southampton	1–0	2–1	3–2	2–3	3–0	1–1	2–1	2–2	4–1	6–3	2–1	0–2	1–2	4–1	2–0	0–2	2–2		1–1	2–2
Tottenham Hotspur	2–1	0–2	3–0	1–4	3–2	0–1	1–2	2–1	1–0	2–1	1–1	2–1	3–1	4–0	2–3	3–2	3–0	2–1		0–1
Wimbledon	1–0	0–2	3–1	0–1	0–0	0–1	1–1	3–1	1–2	1–2	1–0	2–2	2–2	1–1	1–3	0–0	1–1	3–3	1–0	

Legend: Blue = home team win; Yellow = draw; Red = away team win.

== Season statistics ==
=== Top scorers ===
Rank	Player	Club	Goals
1	(England) Gary Lineker	Tottenham Hotspur	24
2	(England) John Barnes	Liverpool	22
3	(England) Kerry Dixon	Chelsea	20
3	(England) Matt Le Tissier	Southampton	20
5	(England) David Platt	Aston Villa	19
6	(Wales) Ian Rush	Liverpool	18
6	(England) Rod Wallace	Southampton	18
8	(England) David Hirst	Sheffield Wednesday	14
8	(Northern Ireland) Kevin Wilson	Chelsea	14
10	(England) Tony Cottee	Everton	13
10	(Wales) Mark Hughes	Manchester United	13

=== Hat-tricks ===
Player	For	Against	Result	Date	Ref
(Wales) Mark Hughes	Manchester United	Millwall	5–1 (H)	16 September 1989	
(England) Trevor Francis	Queens Park Rangers	Aston Villa	3–1 (A)	23 September 1989	
(England) Gary Lineker	Tottenham Hotspur	Queens Park Rangers	3–2 (H)	30 September 1989	
(England) Gary Lineker	Tottenham Hotspur	Norwich City	4–0 (H)	4 February 1990	
(England) Matt Le Tissier	Southampton	Norwich City	4–1 (H)	27 February 1990	
(England) Matt Le Tissier	Southampton	Wimbledon	3–3 (A)	17 March 1990	
(Israel) Ronny Rosenthal	Liverpool	Charlton Athletic	4–0 (A)	11 April 1990	
(England) John Barnes	Liverpool	Coventry City	6–1 (A)	5 May 1990	
(England) Kerry Dixon	Chelsea	Millwall	3–1 (A)	5 May 1990	

Note: (H) – Home; (A) – Away

== Awards ==
=== Annual Awards ===
Award	Winner	Club
PFA Players' Player of the Year	(England) David Platt	Aston Villa
PFA Young Player of the Year	(England) Matt Le Tissier	Southampton
FWA Footballer of the Year	(England) John Barnes	Liverpool

PFA Team of the Year
Goalkeeper	(Wales) Neville Southall (Everton)			
Defenders	(England) Lee Dixon (Arsenal)	(England) Des Walker (Nottingham Forest)	(Scotland) Alan Hansen (Liverpool)	(England) Stuart Pearce (Nottingham Forest)
Midfielders	(England) David Platt (Aston Villa)	(England) Steve Hodge (Nottingham Forest)	(England) Steve McMahon (Liverpool)	(England) John Barnes (Liverpool)
Forwards	(England) Peter Beardsley (Liverpool)		(England) Gary Lineker (Tottenham Hotspur)	

== See also ==
- 1989–90 in English football
