= Tony Dorigo =

Association football player

Personal information
- Full name: Anthony Robert Dorigo
- Date of birth: 31 December 1965 (age 60)
- Place of birth: Melbourne, Victoria, Australia
- Height: 5 ft 9 in (1.75 m)
- Position: Defender

Youth career
- Adelaide City
- 1981–1984: Aston Villa

Senior career*
Years	Team	Apps	(Gls)
1984–1987	Aston Villa	111	(2)
1987–1991	Chelsea	146	(11)
1991–1997	Leeds United	171	(6)
1997–1998	Torino	30	(2)
1998–2000	Derby County	41	(1)
2000–2001	Stoke City	36	(0)
Total		535	(20)

International career
1986–1988	England U21	11	(0)
1989–1992	England B	7	(0)
1989–1993	England	15	(0)
- * Club domestic league appearances and goals

Anthony Robert Dorigo (born 31 December 1965) is a former professional footballer, sports pundit and co-commentator.

As a player, he was a defender from 1983 to 2001. He had lengthy spells in the old First Division for both Aston Villa and Chelsea before signing with Leeds United in 1991 where he won the title and went on to feature in the Premier League from 1992 to 1997. He later had spells in Serie B with Torino before returning to top-flight English football with Derby County. He retired in the Football League with Stoke City in 2001. Despite being born and raised in Australia, he represented the England national team receiving 15 caps. He was also capped at England U21 and England B team level.

Since retirement, Dorigo has worked in the media and has worked as a pundit and commentator for Eurosport, Bravo, Channel 5, ESPN and Sky Sports, amongst others.

== Early life ==
Dorigo was born in Melbourne, Victoria, Australia to an Italian father and an Australian mother. The family soon moved to Adelaide, South Australia, where Dorigo was raised. He played youth football for teams in the area, as well as age-group football for South Australia, and in his mid-teens was training with Adelaide City's first team. Dorigo wrote to 14 top-flight clubs in England and asked for a trial. Aston Villa were the first club to respond and offered him a four-day trial which proved successful.

== Club career ==
The 18-year-old made his league debut for Tony Barton's Aston Villa in a 2-1 loss way to Ipswich on 12 May 1984. Dorigo played under managers Graham Turner and Billy McNeill and went on to win the club's Player of the Year award during his time at Villa Park. Villa were relegated in 1987 and new manager Graham Taylor was appointed with the brief to let the players know he meant business and get the club back into the First Division at the first attempt. Taylor called a meeting to introduce himself to the players. He asked them collectively if any of them had "any problems, any complaints, any desire to leave the club, anything at all they wished to discuss...Everything must be out in the open to start as they meant to go on." There was silence and Taylor repeated the question with similar response. He then turned to Dorigo, saying "Well I understand that Chelsea want to sign you and that you want to go..." Dorigo had to meekly agree that this was the case.

He signed for Chelsea from Aston Villa for £475,000 and won the club's Player of the Year award in his first season, although the team were relegated. He helped Chelsea win promotion back to the First Division at the first attempt. However, he left Chelsea in somewhat acrimonious circumstances in the summer of 1991, having made and then withdrawn a transfer request, and then apparently having fallen out with manager Bobby Campbell after being dropped from the side due to declining a new contract. He was sold to Leeds United for £1.3 million. He made 178 appearances for Chelsea, scoring 12 goals.

Dorigo won the First Division Championship with Leeds in his first season at the club, as well as winning the supporters' Player of the Year award in the same year. He stayed with the club until 1997, when he joined Italian side Torino. At Torino he helped the club reach the promotion play-offs, as well as being awarded the club's Player of the Year, despite missing a penalty in the play-off final.

Due to financial reasons, Torino were forced to release him, with Dorigo then moving back to England to play for Derby County. He scored three goals during his spell at Derby, with one in the league against Nottingham Forest and two in the FA Cup against Huddersfield Town, one in the original tie and again in the replay. He spent a final season at Stoke City, where he was made club captain, before retiring in 2001 at the age of 35. In his final season he played in Division Two (the third tier of the English senior leagues).

== International career ==
Dorigo was initially called up by Australia for the 1986 World Cup qualifying campaign. However Aston Villa manager Tony Barton refused Dorigo permission to travel. Barton felt that playing for Australia would be a waste of time for Dorigo as their opponents were generally weaker opposition from Oceania.

The Football Association approached Dorigo to represent England: "England came along and asked me to play for them if I hung around for another year and got my British citizenship," says Dorigo. "My father was Italian and my mother was Australian, so I have no English parentage at all. What I say to my English friends today is that 'you lot were so bad you needed an Aussie to come and play for you!' It was very different back then to what it is now – the players in the Premier League today fly all over the world to play for their countries. They just did not allow that to happen in my day."

Dorigo later made seven appearances for the England B team and 11 for the England under-21s before going to earn 15 England caps. He made his debut in 1989 against Yugoslavia. A year earlier he was a surprise inclusion in the squad for the European Championships as cover for Kenny Sansom, after regular deputy Stuart Pearce withdrew through injury. Dorigo was also part of the 1990 World Cup squad. He played in the third place play-off defeat to hosts Italy, providing the cross for David Platt to score the equaliser; England eventually lost the match 2–1, however.

== Media career ==
Since retiring he has been a football pundit with various TV and radio networks starting with ITV Digital covering the Championship in 2001–02. He has since worked with Radio Aire covering Leeds United's Premier League campaign as well as TV punditry for Eurosport, Bravo, Channel 5, ESPN and Sky amongst others. He appeared on the James Corden Show on 16 June prior to the England and Germany second round match of the World Cup 2010.

His regular TV work includes La Liga, Serie A and Internationals for Al Jazeera as well as commentating for ESPN. He also commentates for Absolute Radio as part of their live Barclays Premier League coverage as well as appearing a number of times on BBC Radio 5 Live show Fighting Talk. He regularly provides commentary for Leeds United's LUTV alongside Bryn Law. Connor Morrison provides camera work.

== Career statistics ==
=== Club ===
Appearances and goals by club, season and competition
Club	Season	League			FA Cup		League Cup		Other^{[A]}		Total	
Club	Season	Division	Apps	Goals	Apps	Goals	Apps	Goals	Apps	Goals	Apps	Goals
Aston Villa	1983–84	First Division	1	0	0	0	0	0	0	0	1	0
Aston Villa	1984–85	First Division	31	0	1	0	2	0	0	0	34	0
Aston Villa	1985–86	First Division	38	1	4	0	8	0	0	0	50	1
Aston Villa	1986–87	First Division	41	1	2	0	5	0	2	0	50	1
Aston Villa	Total		111	2	7	0	15	0	2	0	135	2
Chelsea	1987–88	First Division	40	0	2	0	2	0	6	0	50	0
Chelsea	1988–89	Second Division	40	6	1	0	1	0	3	0	45	6
Chelsea	1989–90	First Division	35	3	1	0	1	0	5	1	42	4
Chelsea	1990–91	First Division	31	2	0	0	8	0	2	0	41	2
Chelsea	Total		146	11	4	0	12	0	16	1	178	12
Leeds United	1991–92	First Division	38	3	1	0	5	0	1	0	45	3
Leeds United	1992–93	Premier League	33	1	4	0	1	0	5	0	43	1
Leeds United	1993–94	Premier League	37	0	3	0	2	0	0	0	42	0
Leeds United	1994–95	Premier League	28	0	1	0	1	0	0	0	30	0
Leeds United	1995–96	Premier League	17	1	3	0	4	0	2	0	26	1
Leeds United	1996–97	Premier League	18	0	4	0	0	0	0	0	22	0
Leeds United	Total		171	5	16	0	13	0	8	1	208	5
Torino	1997–98	Serie B	30	2	0	0	0	0	0	0	30	2
Derby County	1998–99	Premier League	18	1	3	2	1	0	0	0	22	3
Derby County	1999–2000	Premier League	23	0	1	0	3	0	0	0	27	0
Derby County	Total		41	1	4	2	4	0	0	0	49	3
Stoke City	2000–01	Second Division	36	0	1	0	3	0	1	0	41	0
Career total			535	21	32	2	49	0	27	2	641	24

A. The "Other" column constitutes appearances and goals in the Full Members Cup, Football League play-offs, and Football League Trophy.

=== International ===
Appearances and goals by national team and year
National team	Year	Apps	Goals
England	1989	1	0
England	1990	4	0
England	1991	2	0
England	1992	3	0
England	1993	5	0
Total		15	0

== Honours ==
Chelsea

- Football League Second Division: 1988–89
- Full Members' Cup: 1989–90

Leeds United

- Football League First Division: 1991–92
- FA Charity Shield: 1992

Individual

- Chelsea Player of the Year: 1988
- PFA Team of the Year: 1988–89 Second Division, 1992–93 Premier League

== See also ==
- List of England international footballers born outside England
