= Bernie Gallacher =

Scottish footballer

Personal information
- Full name: Bernard Gallacher
- Date of birth: 22 March 1967
- Place of birth: Johnstone, Scotland
- Date of death: 28 August 2011 (aged 44)
- Place of death: Sutton Coldfield, England
- Height: 5 ft 8 in (1.73 m)
- Position: Defender

Youth career
- 1983–1985: Aston Villa

Senior career*
Years	Team	Apps	(Gls)
1985–1991	Aston Villa	57	(0)
1990	→ Blackburn Rovers (loan)	4	(0)
1991	Doncaster Rovers	2	(0)
1991–1994	Brighton & Hove Albion	45	(1)
1994	Northampton Town	5	(0)
Total		113	(1)
- * Club domestic league appearances and goals

Bernard Gallacher (22 March 1967 – 28 August 2011) was a Scottish professional footballer who made 113 appearances in the English Football League, playing predominantly at left-back.

== Career ==
Born in Johnstone, Scotland, Gallacher joined Aston Villa as a 16-year-old apprentice on leaving school in 1983. He progressed through youth levels, signing a professional contract in March 1985, before making his first team debut on the final day of the 1986-87 season against Manchester United, at the end of a season where Villa were relegated from the First Division.

Gallacher appeared in all but one of Aston Villa's 44 Second Division games the following season as Villa gained promotion back to the top flight at the first attempt as Second Division runners-up. His final game for the club was against Chelsea at Stamford Bridge in November 1990. In all he made 57 league appearances for Villa.

Gallacher spent a loan spell at Blackburn before joining Doncaster Rovers and then Brighton. In 1994 his career was ended by injury at the age of 27 following a short term as a non-contract player with Northampton Town.

== Death ==
Gallacher died in Good Hope Hospital, Sutton Coldfield, England on 28 August 2011, aged 44.
