= Kevin Gage (footballer) =

English footballer

Personal information
- Full name: Kevin William Gage
- Date of birth: 21 April 1964 (age 62)
- Place of birth: Chiswick, England
- Height: 5 ft 9 in (1.75 m)
- Position: Defender

Senior career*
| Years | Team | Apps | (Gls) |
| 1980–1987 | Wimbledon | 168 | (15) |
| 1987–1991 | Aston Villa | 115 | (8) |
| 1991–1996 | Sheffield United | 98 | (2) |
| 1996–1997 | Preston North End | 24 | (0) |
| 1997–1999 | Hull City | 13 | (0) |
| Total | | 431 | (25) |

International career
| 1981 | England Youth | 4 | (1) |
| 1981 | England U20 | 1 | (0) |
- * Club domestic league appearances and goals

Kevin William Gage (born 21 April 1964) is an English former professional footballer who made more than 400 appearances in the Football League and Premier League. Playing either as a full back or in midfield, he began his career with Wimbledon and over a 19-year career also played for Aston Villa, Sheffield United, Preston North End and Hull City.

Following his playing career, Gage became a match day host at Bramall Lane, having continued to live in the area. He has also written columns for the Sheffield Star newspaper.

== Career ==
=== Wimbledon ===
Joining straight from school as an apprentice, Gage was an unused substitute aged just 16 in his first year at the club, later making his league debut a few days after his 17th birthday. He remains the youngest ever player to play for Wimbledon. Although a midfield player, Gage was primarily used in a full back role as Wimbledon's "Crazy Gang", managed by Dave Bassett, rose through the divisions to the top flight in only four years. He played and scored for the same club in all four divisions of the Football League. In 1981–82, Gage gained five England Youth caps and played in the Youth World Cup finals in Australia. At the conclusion of the 1982–1983 season he was intended to play with Finnish side Helsingin Jalkapalloklubi, but suffered an injured hernia in a late season game and was unable to make the move.

=== Aston Villa ===
In June 1987, Gage was bought by Aston Villa for £250,000 to be part of Graham Taylor's new regime to restore Villa to the top division after relegation the previous season. In his first season, Gage was a league and cup ever-present, as Villa gained promotion as Second Division runners-up. In the following two seasons, Gage was used in a variety of positions, switching from full-back to midfield, and also as a wing-back, as Aston Villa ran Liverpool very close to the league title, eventually finishing second in the 1989–90 season. After Taylor left to become England manager, and following Ron Atkinson's re-shaping of the team, Gage left for Sheffield United in November 1991.

=== Sheffield United ===
Gage joined up once more with old boss Dave Bassett, and after scoring on his United debut, helped the team rise from bottom of the table to a 9th-place finish in the last season of the old First Division. The following season, he was part of the team that competed in the new Premier League. The Blades remained in the Premier League that season, but were relegated in 1994. Gage was also Sheffield United Player of the Season for 1994–95. Following Bassett's departure midway through the following season, Gage left to join League Two runaway leaders Preston North End.

=== Preston North End ===
In the first league game as a newly promoted team, Gage sustained a serious knee injury, and was out of action for four months. Despite making a full recovery and after a few games towards the end of the season, Gage joined Hull City in the summer of 1997.

=== Hull City ===
Injuries once again took their toll, limiting Gage's appearances, and he retired from professional football at Christmas 1999, cancelling his contract.

== Honours ==
Wimbledon

- Football League Fourth Division: 1982–83
- Football League Group Cup runner-up: 1981–82
