= David Platt =

English footballer and manager (born 1966)

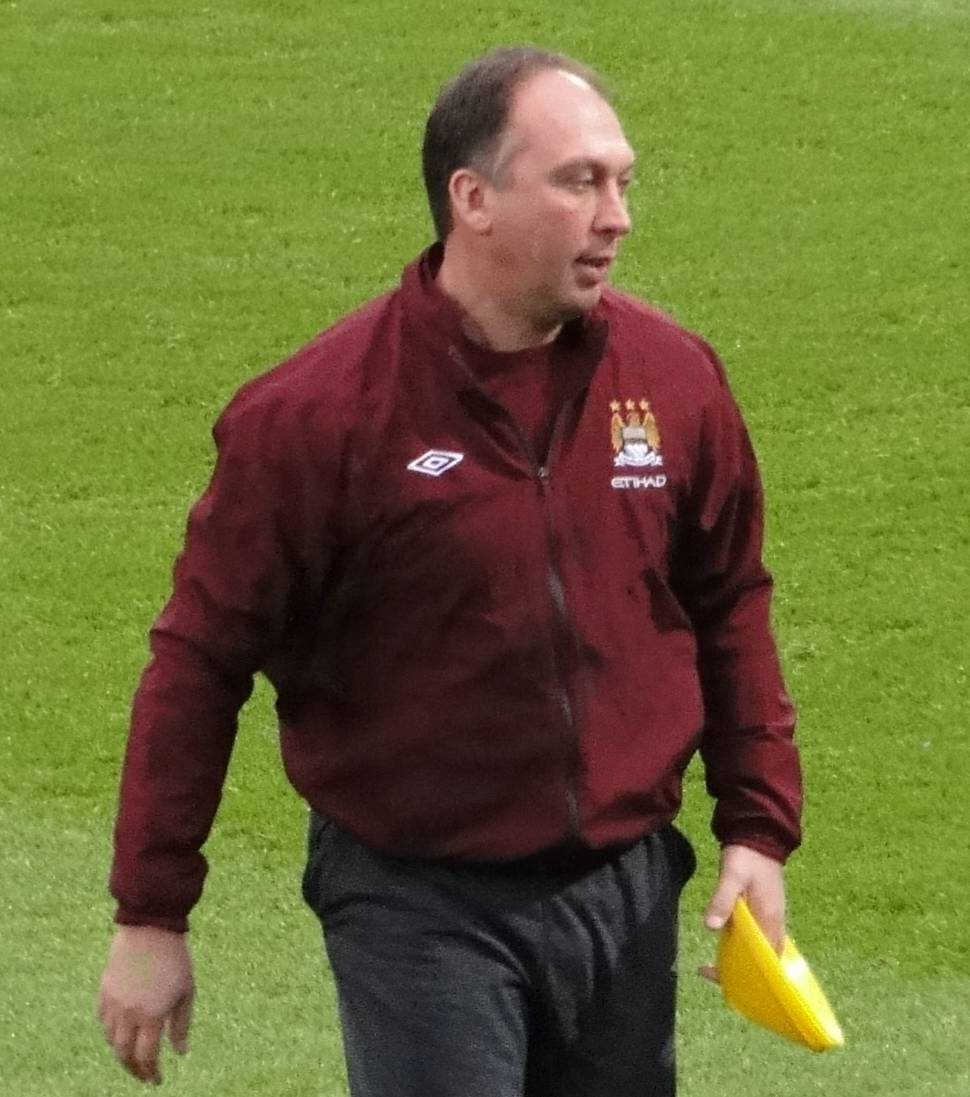
- Platt in 2010

Personal information
- Full name: David Andrew Platt
- Date of birth: 10 June 1966 (age 60)
- Place of birth: Chadderton, Lancashire, England
- Height: 5 ft 10 in (1.78 m)
- Position: Midfielder

Youth career
- –1982: Chadderton
- 1982–1985: Manchester United

Senior career*
Years	Team	Apps	(Gls)
1985–1988	Crewe Alexandra	134	(55)
1988–1991	Aston Villa	121	(50)
1991–1992	Bari	29	(11)
1992–1993	Juventus	16	(3)
1993–1995	Sampdoria	55	(17)
1995–1998	Arsenal	88	(13)
1999–2001	Nottingham Forest	5	(1)
Total		448	(150)

International career
1988	England U21	3	(0)
1989–1996	England B	3	(0)
1989–1996	England	62	(27)

Managerial career
- 1998–1999: Sampdoria
- 1999–2001: Nottingham Forest
- 2001–2004: England U21
- 2015: Pune City
- * Club domestic league appearances and goals

David Andrew Platt (born 10 June 1966) is an English retired football coach and player who played as a midfielder.

Born in Chadderton, Lancashire, Platt began his career as an apprentice at Manchester United before moving to Crewe Alexandra, where he began building a reputation as a goal-scoring midfielder. At the age of 22, he signed for Aston Villa and gained the attention of the England manager Bobby Robson, with whom he soon made his debut. At the 1990 World Cup, Platt increased his reputation with his performances, and by scoring goals with his head and feet. According to Rob Bagchi in The Guardian, Platt "seized Bryan Robson's role with riveting aplomb." His performances in the World Cup earned him a move to Serie A club Bari in 1991.

In 1992, Platt moved to Juventus, where he spent one season. Platt continued scoring goals for England, playing in Euro 1992, and Euro 1996 on home soil. (England failed to qualify for the 1994 FIFA World Cup.) In 1993, he moved to Sampdoria where he stayed for two seasons before he returned to England to join Arsenal. Platt was at the London club for three years, featuring in the Arsenal side that won the Premier League and FA Cup Double in 1998.

Platt went on to manage Sampdoria and Nottingham Forest, as well as England's Under-21 team. He later became a coach with Manchester City.

== Club career ==
=== Manchester United and Crewe Alexandra ===
Platt signed for Manchester United as an apprentice on leaving school in 1982, having been spotted playing for Chadderton. He accepted manager Ron Atkinson's offer of a professional contract at the start of the 1984–85 season, but was given a free transfer on 23 February 1985 without ever playing for the Manchester United first team.

Dario Gradi then signed Platt for Crewe Alexandra in the Fourth Division. He quickly established himself in the first team at Gresty Road as a strong-running, free-scoring midfielder. He played 134 games in the Fourth Division, scoring 55 goals, over the next three years. In the FA Cup, he played three games, scoring one goal. In the League Cup he played four games, scoring four goals.

=== Aston Villa ===
In February 1988, Platt left Crewe—then still a Fourth Division side—to join Second Division Aston Villa for £200,000. He helped his new club earn an instant return to the First Division that season, as runners-up in the Second Division.

He was a frequent goalscorer for Villa, helping re-establish them in the First Division at the end of the 1980s, and in 1989–90 took them to the brink of the league title. Although they had to settle for runners-up spot behind Liverpool, Platt was voted PFA Players' Player of the Year.

The next season, 1990–91, he continued where he left off. In a game against Arsenal he famously went in goal when Nigel Spink was injured in a 5–0 defeat to Arsenal. Platt's success with Villa was evident in his goal-scoring record. In more than three years at Villa Park, he played 121 League games, scoring 50 goals. In the FA Cup, he scored two goals in four games, while in the League Cup he scored 10 goals in 14 games. However, his final season at Villa saw the club finish 17th in the league, and he was already being linked with a move to Italy.

=== Bari ===
On 21 July 1991, Platt moved to Italy to play in Serie A. He signed for A.S. Bari, for £5.5 million, where he was given the captain's armband and the number 10 shirt. He played 29 games in his first season, scoring 11 goals. The 1991–92 Serie A season ended in relegation for Bari.

In January 1992, during his time at Bari, Platt received a phone call from Roberto Mancini, who pressed him to come to Sampdoria. "We'd played Sampdoria a few times and I'd faced Robbie," Platt recalls. "But I didn't know him and he'd tracked my number from somewhere. He said: 'I know you've got a good relationship with your president, I'm sure you could push through a move to us.'" In the end, Platt chose Juventus.

=== Juventus ===
In June 1992, Platt was signed for Juventus for £6.5 million. In domestic competitions, Platt struggled to maintain a first-team place in the Juventus team that season. He scored a decisive goal against S.S.C. Napoli in a 4–3 victory, giving the team a chance at the league title.

He also helped the Turin club win the UEFA Cup. Platt was involved in five matches, including one as an unused substitute. Platt scored the only goal away to Panathinaikos as Juventus won the second-round match 1–0 on aggregate. He played in both semi-final legs against Paris Saint-Germain.

Platt was not listed on the substitutes bench, but he picked up a medal as part of the squad and lifted the trophy after the final. In Serie A, he scored three goals in 16 games.

Mancini persisted despite Platt's move to Turin. "Every two weeks he would be on the phone, pressing me." When things quickly failed to work out in Turin, the move Mancini wanted finally did happen. "Juventus played Sampdoria, Robbie was playing, so I was marking him and hovering around him, hoping he would say something," Platt remembers. "I've always suspected I wasn't on Sampdoria's list that summer, because their president wanted to sign Marco Osio from Parma but he ran the transfer list past Robbie, who had much of the say. I soon made the move."

=== Sampdoria ===
After just one season with Juventus, Platt was soon on the move again. This time he signed for Sampdoria on 14 July 1993 for £5.2 million. Platt won the Coppa Italia in 1994 under Sven-Göran Eriksson. By the time his Italian career came to a close, he was a technically experienced player, possessing dribbling, passing and finishing skills equal to the best. Platt played for exactly two years, until 14 July 1995. He played 55 league games for Sampdoria, scoring 17 goals.

=== Arsenal ===
After four years in Italy with three different clubs, Platt returned to England on 10 July 1995, when new Arsenal manager Bruce Rioch signed him for £4.75 million. Rioch cut short a holiday in Portugal to bring Platt to Arsenal. Platt had been offered a two-year extension to his contract with Sampdoria, but his mind was soon made up after talking to Rioch in Sardinia, where he was on holiday. "Arsenal made it clear that they really wanted me," Platt said. "My talks with Bruce Rioch were exceptional. We hit it off straight away. He is a great communicator with some exciting ideas on tactics and a definite view on how he sees me fitting into his plans." The feelings were mutual. "I'm delighted to sign a player of David's calibre," Rioch said. "I have admired him for a long time and through these discussions with him I have been very impressed by his knowledge, ambition and desire."

In his first season, Arsenal finished fifth in the league and qualified for the UEFA Cup, although Rioch was sacked just before the start of the following season due to a dispute with the board, and succeeded by Arsène Wenger. His first season at Highbury produced six goals from his 29 league appearances, with his first goal in an Arsenal shirt coming in a 2–0 win at Everton in the second game of the campaign. Platt was a regular in Wenger's first season, the 1996–97 campaign, and scored four goals in 28 league appearances, mainly alongside new signing Patrick Vieira in the centre of the Arsenal midfield. Arsenal were top of the table in late autumn, but eventually had to settle for a third-place finish, seven points behind champions Manchester United.

Wenger boosted his midfield department during the summer of 1997 with the arrival of French pair Emmanuel Petit and Gilles Grimandi. The manager's preferred central-midfield pairing was Petit and Vieira, who played a crucial role in Arsenal's double-winning campaign. This severely limited Platt's appearances and he was to make just eleven starts during the season, with a further 20 substitute appearances. He still managed to make a vital contribution to Arsenal's season, however, with a headed winner in a 3–2 victory over Manchester United at Highbury. That proved to be Platt's last season with the Gunners as he retired from playing at the end of the season, with the intention of taking a year out from the game to study coaching before making the move into management. His last match was the 1998 FA Cup Final.

Early in the 1997–98 season, Arsenal accepted a £1.5 million bid from Middlesbrough for Platt, but the transfer never happened and Platt saw out the season at Highbury.

=== Nottingham Forest ===
In July 1999, Platt signed a three-year contract to take over at Nottingham Forest as player-manager, a decision which saw him go back on his plan from a year earlier to retire from playing.

== International career ==
=== 1990 World Cup ===
Platt was given his first England cap by Bobby Robson in a friendly against Italy in November 1989, and was then included in the England squad when Robson named his 22-player squad for the 1990 World Cup.

England had been drawn in Group F with Ireland, the Netherlands and Egypt. Platt came on as a substitute against the Irish and the Dutch but remained on the bench for the game against Egypt. England won the group after a 1–1 draw with Ireland, a 0–0 draw with the Dutch and a 1–0 win against Egypt. England qualified for the knockout stage and were drawn against Belgium. The Belgians dominated the game, hitting the post twice through Enzo Scifo, The game ended 0–0 after ninety minutes. Platt was sent on as an extra-time substitute. In the 119th minute, he scored a volley on the turn from a Paul Gascoigne free-kick, his first goal for his country. Afterwards, and in reflection he said,

"I started as a substitute. I can remember little snatches of the game: John Barnes having a volleyed goal harshly disallowed, Belgium hitting the woodwork twice, I can still see Enzo Scifo hitting the post with a tremendous strike from 25 yards. I was at the other end of the bench from Bobby Robson and didn't have much contact with him. Having since been a manager I now know that the emotions he must have been going through were far more intense than mine. I came on for Steve McMahon [in the 71st minute]."

I had an eye for getting on the end of that sort of ball and the technical ability to finish those chances off. I worked hard on practising overhead kicks and volleys in training at Aston Villa but, even so, if I had re-enacted that chance against Belgium 10 times in training the next day there's a very good chance I wouldn't have scored once from it. It was just one of life's rare, perfect moments."

"The one place where things didn't go right was almost as soon as I left the pitch. One minute I was euphoric and the next I was being hauled off for a random drug test. It was hot and you're so dehydrated after playing that it took 40 minutes – which passed very, very slowly – for me to produce a sample. I was in a room with a couple of Belgians who were seriously unhappy because they'd just been knocked out. I didn't know what to say. By the time I came out the other players all had their suits on and the euphoria had passed".

With captain Bryan Robson having suffered an injury against the Netherlands, Platt started the next game, a quarter-final against Cameroon. He scored the opening goal from a header after a cross from Stuart Pearce on 25 minutes. Cameroon took a 2–1 lead but were beaten 3–2 after extra-time. Platt missed an opportunity to extend England's lead, shooting wide with seconds remaining.

Platt kept his place in the semi-final against West Germany. It finished 1–1, and extra-time was needed. Platt had a headed goal disallowed in extra time. The game was drawn and went to a penalty shootout. He scored England's third penalty, despite Bodo Illgner, the German goalkeeper, getting a hand to the ball. The next two were not converted and England went out of the tournament.

Platt ended the competition on a high by scoring his third goal of the finals in a 2–1 defeat by Italy in the third-place play-off. Roberto Baggio had given the Italians the lead after a mistake by Peter Shilton. On 81 minutes, Tony Dorigo crossed for Platt to place a powerful header into the corner of the Italian net, past Walter Zenga. Italy won the game when Paul Parker fouled Salvatore Schillaci. Schillaci scored the penalty kick. After the World Cup, he retained his starting place in the England team, now managed by Graham Taylor, his former manager at Villa.

=== Euro 1992 ===
Platt was captain for much of this period, though Tony Adams also skippered the side. The official England history regards him as a tireless runner and tidy passer, leading by quiet example and providing inspiration at a time when it was a rare commodity. At one point, it said: "It seemed as if he had been granted the copyright on England goals".

For UEFA Euro 1992 qualifying, England were drawn in Group 7 with Ireland, Turkey and Poland. Platt contributed one goal to the qualifying phase, in a 1–1 away draw with the Irish. It was decisive, as England won the group by a single point, eliminating the other three nations. Platt also scored several goals in friendly games. He liked to run from deep midfield positions, arriving late into the penalty area to pick up upon a pass, making it difficult for defenders to pick him up. He scored two goals against the USSR and one against Argentina during the 1991 England Challenge Cup, which England won. Platt also scored against Brazil, and claimed another two against Finland in the lead-up to the tournament.

At Euro 1992, England were drawn in Group 1 with Sweden, France and Denmark. In the opening game, Platt missed several chances to win the game for England. After only 12 minutes, Peter Schmeichel saved a shot at point-blank range, with which Platt was unable to connect properly. The game ended 0–0. In the match against France, Platt nearly scored with a diving header that went inches wide of the post. The game ended 0–0. England needed to beat hosts Sweden to advance to the semi-finals. Lineker crossed for Platt to open the scoring on four minutes with a mis-kicked volley. England held a slender 1–0 lead at half-time. After half-time, the Swedes changed their personnel and formation and dominated the second half, scoring twice to win 2–1. England were eliminated.

=== 1994 World Cup qualifying ===
England were drawn in Group 2 for the 1994 World Cup qualifying, along with Poland, Turkey, San Marino, the Netherlands and Norway.

The qualifiers began at home to Norway. England dominated the game and Platt carried the goal threat, with Alan Shearer and Ian Wright struggling to find form. He scored the opening goal after an hour. England dominated the remainder of the game and but conceded a goal from a long-range shot from Kjetil Rekdal. Platt continued his drive from midfield in wins over Turkey at home (4–0) and San Marino (6–0). Platt scored four goals and missed a penalty against the Sammarinese. He also scored in 2–0 away win against Turkey. John Barnes crossed from a free-kick for Platt to score with a headed goal.

In a crucial home game against the Netherlands, Platt scored the second goal to put England 2–0 up. A defeat would have ended Dutch hopes of qualification after a home draw against Poland and a defeat away to Norway; however, Dennis Bergkamp pulled a goal back before the break. England still controlled the match, but the Dutch scored a penalty four minutes from time for a 2–2 draw. In general, the team struggled to find form in the spring and summer of 1993. England drew 1–1 in Poland, with their opponents missing several glaring chances. Days later, England lost 2–0 to Norway in Oslo. Platt miscontrolled a pass from Gascoigne that would have put him one-on-one with the goalkeeper Erik Thorstvedt, which, had he scored, would have given England the lead. Thereafter, the Norwegians outplayed the English, and Platt had few chances to make a difference.

In the summer, Platt travelled to the United States with England to take part in the 1993 U.S. Cup, which was supposed to give England crucial experience in a hotter climate. Platt missed the "humiliating" 2–0 loss to the United States through injury. In the second game, he came off the bench to score with his first touch against Brazil, giving England the lead. The game ended 1–1. Platt scored in the final game against Germany, equalising via a passing move with Paul Ince that allowed Platt to tap into an empty net. England lost 2–1.

At the start of the next season England improved, with a 3–0 home win against Poland in which Platt played a part. With two games left, Norway had won the group, leaving England and the Dutch competing for second place in a head-to-head. Both sides had chances and Platt went close to scoring from a corner. With an hour gone, the score was 0–0. Andy Sinton played a through ball that allowed Platt a clear run on goal. Ronald Koeman fouled him just outside the area. The referee failed to send off Koeman. The Dutchman opened the scoring minutes later with a free-kick and England lost the game. England won in San Marino 7–1, but the team finished third in the group and were eliminated. Graham Taylor was sacked. Platt had scored seven of the 29 goals scored by England in the failed campaign.

=== Euro 1996 ===
Graham Taylor's replacement, Terry Venables, kept Platt in his squads. Platt scored the first England goal in the Venables era in March 1994 against Denmark, and also netted against Greece and Nigeria. However, a series of rivals arrived to displace him in the England team. He was not helped by a string of injuries to his left knee. Players like Steve McManaman and Darren Anderton emerged, and Venables decided to employ Ince and Gascoigne in central midfield by the time Euro 1996 came around. Platt had to settle for a place on the bench. In the warm-up game against Hungary, he scored his 27th and final goal for his country. This made him the second-highest-scoring midfielder in the history of the England team. Platt's goal tally was subsequently surpassed by Frank Lampard.

Platt appeared as a substitute in most of the Euro 1996 games, but he started the quarter-final against Spain, as Ince was suspended. In the semi-final against Germany he started, playing 120 minutes. In the second minute of extra-time, he sent McManaman through on the right side of midfield and he delivered a cross to Anderton, who hit the post. Had it gone in, the golden goal rule would have seen England in the final. The match ended 1–1 at the end of extra time and, once again, penalties decided the winner. As in 1990, Platt scored in a penalty shoot-out against Germany but similarly ended up on the losing side. Platt retired from international football soon afterwards, having been capped 62 times and scored 27 goals. 55 appearances were made as a starting player and seven as substitute.

== Managing and media career ==
Within months of leaving Arsenal, Platt returned to Sampdoria as manager, a controversial stint which ended prematurely, with other clubs protesting that Platt did not have the appropriate coaching qualifications for managing in Serie A. Platt resigned before Sampdoria were relegated to Serie B.

In July 1999, Platt was appointed manager of Nottingham Forest, who had just been relegated from the Premier League. He actually made a playing comeback in the 1999–2000 season, playing three Division One games and scoring once against Crystal Palace at the start of the following season.

He was manager at the City Ground for two seasons, but had little success despite spending several million pounds on players who did not perform well and plunging the club into large sums of debt. Platt's tenure at Forest was marred by disagreements with several experienced, long-serving players, leading to them being isolated from the first-team picture and subsequently being released by the club.

Platt was appointed manager of the England U21 on 17 July 2001, which brought a little more success than his stint at Forest. He guided them to qualification for the U-21 European Championships in 2002. He left this role after failing to qualify for the 2004 tournament and was succeeded by Peter Taylor. Platt is now seen as a media pundit often for England U21 matches.

On 1 July 2010, Platt was hired as first-team coach at Manchester City alongside manager (and former teammate) Roberto Mancini, a decision that was not well received by many City fans because of his perceived anti-City stance as a pundit.

He has previously written a regular column for FourFourTwo, commenting on tactics.

On 14 May 2013, Platt left his assistant-manager role at Manchester City following the departure of Mancini.

=== Pune City ===
On 27 May 2015, Platt was announced as the head coach of FC Pune City of the Indian Super League. After one season, Platt was confirmed to not be returning to the Indian club for 2016.

=== Palermo ===
On 3 December 2018, he was appointed as a club consultant for U.S. Città di Palermo of Italy's Serie B following the club takeover by the City Football Group (CFG).

== Personal life ==
Platt is fluent in Italian owing to his time playing there.

He is married to Rachel, with whom he had a son in 2006.

In 1993, he shared the cover of FIFA International Soccer with Piotr Świerczewski, in the first game in this videogame series.

== Career statistics ==
=== Club ===
Appearances and goals by club, season and competition
Club	Season	League			National cup (Note: Includes FA Cup, Coppa Italia)		League cup (Note: Includes Football League Cup)		Europe		Other		Total	
Club	Season	Division	Apps	Goals	Apps	Goals	Apps	Goals	Apps	Goals	Apps	Goals	Apps	Goals
Crewe Alexandra	1984–85	Fourth Division	22	5					–				22	5
Crewe Alexandra	1985–86	Fourth Division	43	9					–				43	9
Crewe Alexandra	1986–87	Fourth Division	43	22					–				43	22
Crewe Alexandra	1987–88	Fourth Division	26	19					–				26	19
Crewe Alexandra	Total		134	55	3	1	8	4	0	0	7	0	152	60
Aston Villa	1987–88	Second Division	11	5	0	0	0	0	–		–		11	5
Aston Villa	1988–89	First Division	38	7	2	1	5	6	–		–		45	14
Aston Villa	1989–90	First Division	37	19	5	1	4	1	–		–		46	21
Aston Villa	1990–91	First Division	35	19	2	0	5	3	4 (Note: Appearances in UEFA Cup)	2	–		46	24
Aston Villa	Total		121	50	9	2	14	10	4	2	0	0	148	64
Bari	1991–92	Serie A	29	11	6	4	–		–		–		35	15
Juventus	1992–93	Serie A	16	3	6	0	–		6	1	–		28	4
Sampdoria	1993–94	Serie A	29	9	9	2	–		–		–		38	11
Sampdoria	1994–95	Serie A	26	8	2	0	–		5 (Note: Appearances in UEFA Cup Winners' Cup)	2	1 (Note: Appearance in Supercoppa Italiana)	0	34	10
Sampdoria	Total		55	17	11	2	0	0	5	2	1	0	72	21
Arsenal	1995–96	Premier League	29	6	1	0	3	0	–		–		33	6
Arsenal	1996–97	Premier League	28	4	1	0	3	1	2	0	–		34	5
Arsenal	1997–98	Premier League	31	3	4	0	4	1	2	0	–		41	4
Arsenal	Total		88	13	6	0	10	2	4	0	0	0	108	15
Nottingham Forest	1999–2000	First Division	3	0	0	0	0	0	–		–		3	0
Nottingham Forest	2000–01	First Division	2	1	0	0	2	0	–		–		4	1
Nottingham Forest	Total		5	1	0	0	2	0	0	0	0	0	7	1
Career total			448	150	41	9	34	16	19	5	8	0	551	180

=== International ===
Appearances and goals by national team and year
National team	Year	Apps	Goals
England	1989	2	0
England	1990	12	3
England	1991	11	4
England	1992	10	5
England	1993	10	8
England	1994	5	4
England	1995	5	2
England	1996	7	1
Total		62	27

Scores and results list England's goal tally first, score column indicates score after each Shearer goal.

List of international goals scored by David Platt
No.	Date	Venue	Cap	Opponent	Score	Result	Competition
1	26 June 1990	Stadio Renato Dall'Ara, Bologna	8	Belgium	1–0	1-0	1990 FIFA World Cup
2	1 July 1990	Stadio San Paolo, Naples	9	Cameroon	0–1	2–3	1990 FIFA World Cup
3	7 July 1990	Stadio San Nicola, Bari	11	Italy	1–1	2–1	1990 FIFA World Cup
4	27 March 1991	Lansdowne Road, Dublin	14	Republic of Ireland	0–1	1–1	UEFA Euro 1992 qualification
5	21 May 1991	Wembley Stadium, London	17	Soviet Union	2–1	3–1	Friendly match
6	21 May 1991	Wembley Stadium, London	17	Soviet Union	3–1	3–1	Friendly match
7	25 May 1991	Wembley Stadium, London	18	Argentina	2–0	2–2	Friendly match
8	17 May 1992	Wembley Stadium, London	28	Brazil	1–1	1–1	Friendly match
9	3 June 1992	Helsinki Olympic Stadium, Helsinki	29	Finland	1–1	1–2	Friendly match
10	3 June 1992	Helsinki Olympic Stadium, Helsinki	29	Finland	1–2	1–2	Friendly match
11	17 June 1992	Råsunda Stadium, Solna	32	Sweden	0–1	2–1	UEFA Euro 1992
12	14 October 1992	Wembley Stadium, London	34	Norway	1–0	1–1	1994 World Cup qualification
13	17 February 1993	Wembley Stadium, London	36	San Marino	1–0	6–0	1994 World Cup qualification
14	17 February 1993	Wembley Stadium, London	36	San Marino	2–0	6–0	1994 World Cup qualification
15	17 February 1993	Wembley Stadium, London	36	San Marino	3–0	6–0	1994 World Cup qualification
16	17 February 1993	Wembley Stadium, London	36	San Marino	5–0	6–0	1994 World Cup qualification
17	31 March 1993	Kemal Atatürk Stadium, İzmir	37	Turkey	0–1	0–2	1994 World Cup qualification
18	28 April 1993	Wembley Stadium, London	38	Netherlands	1–0	2–2	1994 World Cup qualification
19	13 June 1993	Robert F. Kennedy Memorial Stadium, Washington, D.C.	41	Brazil	1–0	1–1	United States Cup
20	19 June 1993	Pontiac Silverdome, Detroit	42	Germany	1–1	1–2	United States Cup
21	9 March 1994	Wembley Stadium, London	46	Denmark	1–0	1–0	Friendly match
22	17 May 1994	Wembley Stadium, London	47	Greece	3–0	5–0	Friendly match
23	17 May 1994	Wembley Stadium, London	47	Greece	4–0	5–0	Friendly match
24	16 November 1994	Wembley Stadium, London	50	Nigeria	1–0	1–0	Friendly match
25	3 June 1995	Wembley Stadium, London	53	Japan	2–1	2–1	Friendly match
26	8 June 1995	Elland Road, Leeds	54	Sweden	2–3	3–3	Friendly match
27	18 May 1996	Wembley Stadium, London	58	Hungary	2–0	3–0	Friendly match

== Honours ==
Juventus

- UEFA Cup: 1992–93

Sampdoria

- Coppa Italia: 1993–94

Arsenal

- Premier League: 1997–98
- FA Cup: 1997–98

Individual

- PFA Players' Player of the Year: 1989–90
- PFA Team of the Year: 1989–90 First Division

== Managerial statistics ==
Team	Nat	From	To	Record				
Team	Nat	From	To	G	W	L	D	Win %
Sampdoria	(Italy)	13 December 1998	31 January 1999	6	0	3	3	0.00
Nottingham Forest	(England)	July 1999	July 2001	103	37	41	25	35.92
England U21	(England)	July 2001	July 2004	26	12	8	6	46.15
Pune City	(India)	27 May 2015	20 December 2015	8	4	3	1	50.00
Total				143	53	55	35	37.06
