= Warren Aspinall =

English footballer (born 1967)

Personal information
- Full name: Warren Aspinall
- Date of birth: 13 September 1967 (age 59)
- Place of birth: Wigan, England
- Height: 1.73 m (5 ft 8 in)
- Positions: Midfielder; forward

Youth career
- 1980–1985: Wigan Athletic

Senior career*
Years	Team	Apps	(Gls)
1985–1986	Wigan Athletic	33	(10)
1986–1987	Everton	7	(0)
1986	→ Wigan Athletic (loan)	18	(12)
1987–1988	Aston Villa	44	(14)
1988–1993	Portsmouth	133	(21)
1993	→ AFC Bournemouth (loan)	6	(1)
1993	→ Swansea City (loan)	5	(0)
1993–1995	AFC Bournemouth	27	(8)
1995–1997	Carlisle United	107	(12)
1997–1999	Brentford	43	(5)
1999	→ Colchester United (loan)	6	(0)
1999	Colchester United	16	(5)
1999	→ Brighton & Hove Albion (loan)	7	(1)
1999–2000	Brighton & Hove Albion	25	(2)
Total		477	(91)

International career
1986	England Youth	2	(0)
- * Club domestic league appearances and goals

Warren Aspinall (born 13 September 1967) is an English former footballer who played as a midfielder or forward in the Football League, most notably for Portsmouth and Carlisle United. He began his career with hometown club Wigan Athletic, earning a good reputation as a goalscorer from a young age and securing a move to First Division club Everton, being loaned back to Wigan until the end of the season. He later joined Aston Villa for a club record fee of £315,000, helping the club back to the top tier of English football, before signing for Portsmouth for another club record fee. He made over 150 appearances in all competitions for Pompey, before moving to AFC Bournemouth after a loan spell at the club and Swansea City. He later played for Carlisle, aiding the club's promotion cause and helping them win the Football League Trophy. He also played for Brentford, Colchester United and Brighton & Hove Albion. He retired from playing through an ankle injury in 2000.

After his retirement from the game, his alcoholism and gambling addiction brought him to the brink of suicide after losing £1 million that he had earned during his career. Following his recovery after checking into the Sporting Chance clinic, Aspinall became an advocate for the Samaritans, fronting their "Men on the Ropes" campaign and has talked openly about his alcohol and gambling problems to aid other males in similar situations.

== Career ==
Born in Wigan, Aspinall began his career as a 13-year-old apprentice with hometown club Wigan Athletic. He signed a professional contract at the age of 17 and made his debut in March 1985 in an away game against Leyton Orient. He made 33 league appearances and scored ten goals for Wigan, before being sold to Everton in 1986 for £150,000. He was immediately loaned back to Wigan, scoring a further 12 goals in 18 league appearances. With Wigan's season completed, Aspinall returned to Everton, where he came on as a substitute for Gary Lineker in a 3–1 victory.

After making only ten substitute appearances in all competitions for the Toffees, Aspinall transferred to Aston Villa for a then club record fee of £300,000, but could not help stop the club being relegated from the First Division. Manager Billy McNeill, who signed Aspinall, was sacked and replaced by Graham Taylor, as Villa bounced back immediately to the First Division, with Aspinall finishing as joint-top scorer. However, a poor disciplinary record prompted a warning from Taylor that this must improve or he would be sold. An incident away to St Mirren in a pre-season friendly involved Aspinall stamping on an opponent's foot led to him being sold to Portsmouth for a club-record fee of £315,000 in August 1988. He played in 44 league games and scored 14 goals for Aston Villa.

In five years at Fratton Park, Aspinall made over 150 appearances in all competitions, scoring 28 goals, and under Jim Smith helped the club reach the 1992 FA Cup semi-final, going out on penalties before Aspinall could take his kick. The team also narrowly missed out on promotion to the Premier League, but missed out by two goals. After loan spells at AFC Bournemouth and Swansea City, playing six games for each club and scoring only once for Bournemouth, he was sold to Bournemouth for £20,000 in December 1993.

With limited chances at Bournemouth, scoring eight goals in 28 league games, Aspinall signed for Carlisle United on a free transfer. Making 132 appearances and scoring 16 goals, he helped the club to promotion and won the Football League Trophy. In 1997, he joined Brentford for £50,000, citing wanting to move back to the south of England as his reasons for leaving Carlisle. He was later loaned out to Colchester United after scoring just five league goals in 43 appearances for the Bees. He signed permanently for Colchester in March 1999, and was made captain of the team in the summer of 1999. However, he was later loaned to Brighton in September 1999, with the move being made permanent in November of the same year.

It was with Brighton that Aspinall was forced to retire from playing early through injury, after suffering from a long-term ankle problem. Aspinall had contracted MRSA following an operation on his ankle that went wrong, spending 27 days in hospital as a result.

== Personal life ==
After leaving the game, Aspinall turned to drink and picked up a gambling addiction. His gambling cost him around £1 million that he had earned during his long career. On the verge of suicide, after narrowly avoiding death by train, saved only by last minute thoughts of his family, he checked himself into the Sporting Chance clinic. He has fronted a Samaritans campaign, "Men on the Ropes", that aims to reduce male suicides.

In 2009 Aspinall was working in a Sainsbury's distribution centre in Basingstoke and scouting for League Two side Port Vale under manager Micky Adams. Since 2015 he has worked for radio station BBC Sussex as a summariser for Brighton & Hove Albion matches.

His elder brother Wayne Aspinall also played briefly in the Football League, making a solitary appearance for Wigan Athletic in March 1984 against Preston North End.

== Honours ==
Wigan Athletic

- Associate Members' Cup: 1984–85

Aston Villa

- Football League Second Division runner-up: 1987–88

Carlisle United

- Football League Third Division: 1994–95
- Football League Trophy: 1996–97

Brentford

- Football League Third Division: 1998–99

Individual

- PFA Team of the Year: 1996–97 Third Division

All honours referenced by:
