= 1972 in association football =

The following are the football (soccer) events of the year 1972 throughout the world.

== Events ==
- 24 May – Copa Libertadores 1972: Won by Independiente after defeating Universitario de Deportes on an aggregate score of 2-1.
- 11 May – Ajax Amsterdam claims the Dutch Cup by defeating FC Den Haag: 3-2.
- 12 October – the 1972–73 Honduran League was canceled due to economic problems.
- 18 November 1972 –1972 Scotland v England women's football match

== Winners club national championship ==
=== Asia ===
- Qatar: Al-Sadd SC

=== Europe ===
- Denmark: Vejle BK
- East Germany: Magdeburg
- England: Derby County
- France: Olympique de Marseille
- Hungary: Újpest FC
- Italy: Juventus
- Netherlands: Ajax Amsterdam
- Scotland: Celtic
- Soviet Union: Zorya Voroshilovgrad
- Spain: Real Madrid
- Turkey: Galatasaray S.K.
- West Germany: Bayern Munich

=== North America ===
- Mexico: Cruz Azul
- United States / Canada:
  - New York Cosmos (NASL)

=== South America ===
- Argentina
  - San Lorenzo - Metropolitano
  - San Lorenzo - Nacional
- Brazil: Palmeiras

== International tournaments ==
- African Cup of Nations in Cameroon (February 23 – March 5, 1972)
  1. Congo
  2. Mali
  3. Cameroon
- 1972 British Home Championship (May 20 – May 27, 1972)

Shared by England and Scotland

- UEFA European Football Championship in Belgium (June 14 – 18 1972)
  1. West Germany
  2. Soviet Union
  3. Belgium
- Olympic Games in Munich, West Germany (August 26 – September 10, 1972)
  1. Poland
  2. Hungary
  3. Soviet Union and East Germany

== Births ==
- January 1
  - Christos Kiourkos, retired Greek footballer
  - Lilian Thuram, French international footballer
- January 2 – Eduardo Pereira, Timorese footballer
- January 3 – Manuel Martínez, Mexican international footballer
- January 5 – Richard Sosa, Uruguayan former footballer
- January 8
  - Paul Clement, English footballer, coach, and manager
  - Giuseppe Favalli, Italian footballer
  - Esteban Valencia, Chilean international footballer
- January 11 – Huub Loeffen, Dutch footballer
- January 16
  - Ruben Bagger, Danish footballer
  - Yuri Alekseevich Drozdov, Russian footballer
  - Ezra Hendrickson, Vincentian footballer
  - Alen Peternac, Croatian footballer
- January 29
  - Artur Belotserkovets, Russian former professional footballer
  - Joseph Oosting, Dutch footballer
- February 11 – Steve McManaman, English international footballer
- February 20 – Andrei Nemykin, Russian footballer
- March 2 – Mauricio Pochettino, Argentine football player and manager
- March 3
  - Darren Anderton, English international footballer
  - Karel Poborský, Czech international footballer
- March 17
  - Mia Hamm, American women's soccer player
  - Antonis Papadimitriou, retired Greek footballer
- March 23 – Daniel Prodan, Romanian international footballer (died 2016)
- March 28 – Péter Lipcsei, Hungarian footballer
- March 29 – Rui Costa, Portuguese footballer
- April 28 – Jean-Paul van Gastel, Dutch footballer
- April 28 – Wilmer Velásquez, Honduran international footballer
- May 8 – José Alberto Guadarrama, Mexican footballer
- May 10 – Radosław Majdan, Polish goalkeeper
- May 13 – Gytis Padimanskas, Lithuanian professional footballer
- June 15 – Marcus Hahnemann, American soccer player
- June 23 – Zinedine Zidane, French international footballer
- August 7 – Goran Vlaović, Croatian footballer
- August 30 – Pavel Nedvěd, Czech international footballer
- September 8 – Markus Babbel, German international footballer and manager
- September 9 – Alexandre Clot, retired Swiss footballer
- September 10 – João Carlos dos Santos, Brazilian international footballer
- September 10 – Mariano Bombarda, Spanish footballer
- September 29 – Björn Arens, retired German footballer
- October 1 – Jean Paulo Fernandes, Brazilian footballer
- October 2 – Jacob Eli Olsen, Faroese former footballer
- October 11 – Hajnalka Sipos, Hungarian footballer
- November 2 – Derlis Gómez, Paraguayan footballer
- November 2 – Darío Silva, Uruguayan footballer
- November 4 – Luís Figo, Portuguese international footballer
- November 11 – Nurmat Mirzabaev, Kazakhstani footballer
- December 11 – Andriy Husin, Ukrainian international footballer and coach (died 2014)
- December 16 – Aleksei Morochko, former Russian footballer
- December 22 – Claudio Guerra, former Uruguayan footballer
- December 29 – Losseni Konaté, Ivorian footballer
- December 31 – Roberto Baldassari, retired Swiss footballer

== Deaths ==
- June 9 – Caesar ten Cate, Dutch international footballer (born 1890)
- September 16 – Jan de Natris (76), Dutch international footballer (born 1895)
