= 1990–91 Aston Villa F.C. season =

English football club season

Aston Villa
1990–91 season
- Chairman: Doug Ellis
- Manager: Jozef Vengloš
- Stadium: Villa Park
- First Division: 17th
- FA Cup: Third round
- League Cup: Fifth round
- UEFA Cup: Second round
- Top goalscorer: League: All: David Platt (24)

The 1990–91 English football season was Aston Villa's 6th season in Europe and 92nd season in the Football League. Villa competed in the Football League First Division.

A season after finishing as runners-up, Villa dropped to 17th in the table following the departure of manager Graham Taylor, who took charge of the England national football team in July 1990. His replacement, Jozef Vengloš, left after just a season in charge as manager and was in turn replaced by Sheffield Wednesday's Ron Atkinson.

There were debuts for Gary Penrice (20) and Ivo Staš.

== First Division ==
| Pos | Team | Pld | W | D | L | GF | GA | GD | Pts | Qualification or relegation |
|---|---|---|---|---|---|---|---|---|---|---|
| 15 | Norwich City | 38 | 13 | 6 | 19 | 41 | 64 | −23 | 45 | |
| 16 | Coventry City | 38 | 11 | 11 | 16 | 42 | 49 | −7 | 44 | |
| 17 | Aston Villa | 38 | 9 | 14 | 15 | 46 | 58 | −12 | 41 | |
| 18 | Luton Town | 38 | 10 | 7 | 21 | 42 | 61 | −19 | 37 | |
| 19 | Sunderland (R) | 38 | 8 | 10 | 20 | 38 | 60 | −22 | 34 | Relegation to the Second Division |

Source: World Football
Rules for classification: 1) Points; 2) Goal difference; 3) Goals scored
(R) Relegated

=== Matches ===
| 25 August 1990 1 | Aston Villa | 1–1 | Southampton | Birmingham |
| | Cascarino 11' | | Le Tissier 7' | Stadium: Villa Park; Attendance: 29,542 |

| 1 September 1990 2 | Liverpool | 2–1 | Aston Villa | Liverpool |
| | Beardsley 12'; Barnes 87' | | Platt 26' | Stadium: Anfield; Attendance: 38,061 |

| 5 September 1990 3 | Manchester City | 2–1 | Aston Villa | Manchester |
| | Ward 47' (pen.); Pointon 79' | | Platt 82' (pen.) | Stadium: Maine Road; Attendance: 30,199 |

| 8 September 1990 4 | Aston Villa | 2–1 | Coventry City | Birmingham |
| | Platt 38' (pen.); Cascarino 78' | | Borrows 50' | Stadium: Villa Park; Attendance: 27,001 |

| 15 September 1990 5 | Derby County | 0–2 | Aston Villa | Derby |
| | | | Daley 15'; Platt 74' | Stadium: Baseball Ground; Attendance: 19,024 |

| 22 September 1990 6 | Aston Villa | 2–2 | Queens Park Rangers | Birmingham |
| | Mountfield 19'; Ormondroyd 31' | | Wegerle 27' (pen.); Sinton 44' | Stadium: Villa Park; Attendance: 23,301 |

| 29 September 1990 7 | Tottenham Hotspur | 2–1 | Aston Villa | London |
| | Lineker 44'; Allen 81' | | Platt 33' | Stadium: White Hart Lane; Attendance: 34,939 |

| 6 October 1990 8 | Aston Villa | 3–0 | Sunderland | Birmingham |
| | Olney 44'; Daley 68'; Platt 76' | | | Stadium: Villa Park; Attendance: 26,017 |

| 20 October 1990 9 | Wimbledon | 0–0 | Aston Villa | London |
| | | | | Stadium: Plough Lane; Attendance: 6,646 |

| 27 October 1990 10 | Aston Villa | 0–0 | Leeds United | Birmingham |
| | | | | Stadium: Villa Park; Attendance: 24,219 |

| 3 November 1990 11 | Chelsea | 1–0 | Aston Villa | London |
| | Le Saux 6' | | | Stadium: Stamford Bridge; Attendance: 23,555 |

| 10 November 1990 12 | Aston Villa | 1–1 | Nottingham Forest | Birmingham |
| | Nielsen 62' | | Carr 74' | Stadium: Villa Park; Attendance: 25,797 |

| 17 November 1990 13 | Norwich City | 2–0 | Aston Villa | Norwich |
| | Crook 4'; Fox 70' | | | Stadium: Carrow Road; Attendance: 17,243 |

| 24 November 1990 14 | Luton Town | 2–0 | Aston Villa | Luton |
| | Black 44'; Elstrup 85' | | | Stadium: Kenilworth Road; Attendance: 10,071 |

| 1 December 1990 15 | Aston Villa | 2–1 | Sheffield United | Birmingham |
| | Platt 9'; Price 81' | | Jones 50' | Stadium: Villa Park; Attendance: 21,713 |

| 15 December 1990 16 | Southampton | 1–1 | Aston Villa | Southampton |
| | Le Tissier 42' | | Platt 78' | Stadium: The Dell; Attendance: 16,604 |

| 23 December 1990 17 | Aston Villa | 0–0 | Arsenal | Birmingham |
| | | | | Stadium: Villa Park; Attendance: 22,687 |

| 26 December 1990 18 | Everton | 1–0 | Aston Villa | Liverpool |
| | Sharp 78' | | | Stadium: Goodison Park; Attendance: 27,804 |

| 29 December 1990 19 | Manchester United | 1–1 | Aston Villa | Manchester |
| | Bruce 18' (pen.) | | Pallister 32' (o.g.) | Stadium: Old Trafford; Attendance: 47,485 |

| 1 January 1991 20 | Aston Villa | 2–0 | Crystal Palace | Birmingham |
| | Platt 47', 87' | | | Stadium: Villa Park; Attendance: 25,523 |

| 12 January 1991 21 | Aston Villa | 0–0 | Liverpool | Birmingham |
| | | | | Stadium: Villa Park; Attendance: 40,026 |

| 19 January 1991 22 | Coventry City | 2–1 | Aston Villa | Coventry |
| | Gynn 54'; Speedie 80' | | Platt 52' | Stadium: Highfield Road; Attendance: 15,751 |

| 2 February 1991 23 | Aston Villa | 3–2 | Derby County | Birmingham |
| | Cowans 29' (pen.); Cascarino 74'; Yorke 77' | | Harford 27'; Sage 82' | Stadium: Villa Park; Attendance: 21,852 |

| 23 February 1991 24 | Nottingham Forest | 2–2 | Aston Villa | Nottingham |
| | Clough 3'; Hodge 88' | | Cascarino 49'; Mountfield 54' | Stadium: City Ground; Attendance: 22,036 |

| 2 March 1991 25 | Sheffield United | 2–1 | Aston Villa | Sheffield |
| | Bryson 48'; Deane 61' | | Mountfield 56' | Stadium: Bramall Lane; Attendance: 22,074 |

| 9 March 1991 26 | Aston Villa | 1–2 | Luton Town | Birmingham |
| | Cascarino 69' | | Mountfield 27' (o.g.); Pembridge 45' | Stadium: Villa Park; Attendance: 20,587 |

| 16 March 1991 27 | Aston Villa | 3–2 | Tottenham Hotspur | Birmingham |
| | Platt 12', 35', 46' | | Samways 62'; Allen 83' | Stadium: Villa Park; Attendance: 32,638 |

| 23 March 1991 28 | Sunderland | 1–3 | Aston Villa | Sunderland |
| | Davenport 55' | | Cascarino 36', 52'; Platt 76' | Stadium: Roker Park; Attendance: 21,099 |

| 30 March 1991 29 | Aston Villa | 2–2 | Everton | Birmingham |
| | Platt 78'; Olney 89' | | Warzycha 2', 57' | Stadium: Villa Park; Attendance: 27,660 |

| 3 April 1991 30 | Arsenal | 5–0 | Aston Villa | London |
| | Campbell 37', 83'; Davis 55'; Smith 59', 90' | | | Stadium: Highbury; Attendance: 41,868 |

| 6 April 1991 31 | Aston Villa | 1–1 | Manchester United | Birmingham |
| | Cascarino 56' | | Sharpe 63' | Stadium: Villa Park; Attendance: 33,307 |

| 10 April 1991 32 | Queens Park Rangers | 2–1 | Aston Villa | London |
| | Allen 76'; Tillson 78' | | Platt 33' | Stadium: Loftus Road; Attendance: 11,539 |

| 13 April 1991 33 | Crystal Palace | 0–0 | Aston Villa | London |
| | | | | Stadium: Selhurst Park; Attendance: 18,331 |

| 20 April 1991 34 | Aston Villa | 1–2 | Wimbledon | Birmingham |
| | Olney 35' | | Fashanu 42'; Newhouse 81' | Stadium: Villa Park; Attendance: 17,001 |

| 23 April 1991 35 | Aston Villa | 1–5 | Manchester City | Birmingham |
| | Platt 69' (pen.) | | White 4', 34', 84', 90'; Brennan 61' | Stadium: Villa Park; Attendance: 24,168 |

| 4 May 1991 36 | Leeds United | 5–2 | Aston Villa | Leeds |
| | Price 23' (o.g.); Chapman 37', 87'; Whyte 72'; Shutt 78' | | Nielsen 27'; Mountfield 56' | Stadium: Elland Road; Attendance: 29,188 |

| 8 May 1991 37 | Aston Villa | 2–1 | Norwich City | Birmingham |
| | Bowen 9'; Yorke 66' | | Gordon 42' | Stadium: Villa Park; Attendance: 16,697 |

| 11 May 1991 38 | Aston Villa | 2–2 | Chelsea | Birmingham |
| | Cascarino 13'; Platt 74' (pen.) | | Cundy 2'; Stuart 4' | Stadium: Villa Park; Attendance: 27,866 |

== UEFA Cup ==
| 18 September 1990 First Round First Leg | Aston Villa | 3–1 | Baník Ostrava | Birmingham |
| | Platt 32'; Mountfield 58'; Olney 78' | | Chýlek 31' | Stadium: Villa Park; Attendance: 27,317 |

| 2 October 1990 First Round Second Leg | Baník Ostrava | 1–2 (2–5 agg.) | Aston Villa | Ostrava |
| | Nečas 41' | | Mountfield 52'; Staš 59' (o.g.) | Stadium: Bazaly; Attendance: 13,544 |

| 24 October 1990 Second Round First Leg | Aston Villa | 2–0 | Inter Milan | Birmingham |
| | Nielsen 14'; Platt 67' | | | Stadium: Villa Park; Attendance: 36,461 |

| 7 November 1991 Second Round Second Leg | Inter Milan | 3–0 (3–2 agg.) | Aston Villa | Milan |
| | Klinsmann 7'; Berti 64'; Bianchi 75' | | | Stadium: San Siro; Attendance: 32,800 |

== FA Cup ==
| 5 January 1991 Third Round | Aston Villa | 1–1 | Wimbledon | Birmingham |
| | Gray | | | Stadium: Villa Park; Attendance: 19,305 |

| 9 January 1991 Third Round Replay | Wimbledon | 1–0 | Aston Villa | London |
| | | | | Stadium: Plough Lane; Attendance: 7,382 |

== League Cup ==
| 26 September 1990 Second Round First Leg | Aston Villa | 1–0 | Barnsley | Birmingham |
| | Platt | | | Stadium: Villa Park; Attendance: 14,471 |

| 9 October 1990 Second Round Second Leg | Barnsley | 0–1 (0–2 agg.) | Aston Villa | Barnsley |
| | | | Daley | Stadium: Oakwell; Attendance: 13,924 |

| 31 October 1990 Third Round | Aston Villa | 2–0 | Millwall | Birmingham |
| | Cascarino; Platt (pen.) | | | Stadium: Villa Park; Attendance: 15,117 |

| 28 November 1990 Fourth Round | Aston Villa | 3–2 | Middlesbrough | Birmingham |
| | Daley; Ormondroyd; Platt (pen.) | | Slaven x2 | Stadium: Villa Park; Attendance: 17,317 |

| 16 January 1991 Quarter Final | Leeds United | 4–1 | Aston Villa | Leeds |
| | | | Ormondroyd | Stadium: Elland Road; Attendance: 28,176 |

== First-team squad ==
Squad at end of season

Note: Flags indicate national team as defined under FIFA eligibility rules; some limited exceptions apply. Players may hold more than one non-FIFA nationality.

| Pos. | Nation | Player |
|---|---|---|
| GK | ENG | Lee Butler |
| GK | ENG | Nigel Spink |
| DF | ENG | Andy Comyn |
| DF | ENG | Kevin Gage |
| DF | ENG | Derek Mountfield |
| DF | ENG | Chris Price |
| DF | SCO | Bernie Gallacher |
| DF | IRL | Paul McGrath |
| DF | DEN | Kent Nielsen |
| DF | CZE | Ivo Staš |
| MF | ENG | Mark Blake |

| Pos. | Nation | Player |
|---|---|---|
| MF | ENG | Nigel Callaghan |
| MF | ENG | Gordon Cowans |
| MF | ENG | Tony Daley |
| MF | ENG | Stuart Gray |
| MF | ENG | David Platt |
| FW | ENG | Ian Olney |
| FW | ENG | Ian Ormondroyd |
| FW | ENG | Gary Penrice |
| FW | IRL | Tony Cascarino |
| FW | TTO | Dwight Yorke |

=== Left club during season ===
Note: Flags indicate national team as defined under FIFA eligibility rules; some limited exceptions apply. Players may hold more than one non-FIFA nationality.

| Pos. | Nation | Player |
|---|---|---|
| GK | ENG | Lee Butler (on loan to Hull City) |
| DF | SCO | Bernie Gallacher (on loan to Blackburn Rovers) |

| Pos. | Nation | Player |
|---|---|---|
| MF | ENG | Paul Birch (to Wolverhampton Wanderers) |

== Reserves and academy ==
The following players spent most of the season playing for the reserve team, and did not appear for the senior team.

Note: Flags indicate national team as defined under FIFA eligibility rules; some limited exceptions apply. Players may hold more than one non-FIFA nationality.

| Pos. | Nation | Player |
|---|---|---|
| DF | ENG | Neil Cox |
| DF | ENG | Darrell Duffy |
| DF | ENG | Craig Liddle |
| DF | ENG | Richard Money (coach) |
| DF | ENG | Bryan Small |
| DF | ENG | Paul Towler |
| DF | IRL | Brian Flood |

| Pos. | Nation | Player |
|---|---|---|
| MF | ENG | Richard Crisp |
| MF | ENG | Nick Roddis |
| MF | ENG | Gareth Williams |
| FW | ENG | Mark Parrott |
| FW | ENG | Peter Withe (coach) |
| FW | WAL | David Jones |
| FW | SVK | Viliam Hýravý (on trial from Baník Ostrava) |

Youth

The following players spent most of the season playing for the youth team, but may have also appeared for the reserve team.

Note: Flags indicate national team as defined under FIFA eligibility rules; some limited exceptions apply. Players may hold more than one non-FIFA nationality.

| Pos. | Nation | Player |
|---|---|---|
| GK | ENG | Glen Livingstone |
| GK | ENG | Michael Oakes |
| DF | ENG | Chris Boden |
| DF | ENG | Russell Bullivant |
| DF | ENG | Matt Carbon |
| DF | ENG | Neil Hoban |
| DF | ENG | Wayne Peachey |
| DF | ENG | Dennis Pearce |
| DF | ENG | Riccardo Scimeca |
| DF | SCO | Paul Browne |
| DF | WAL | Craig Goodwin |
| MF | ENG | Steven Cowe |
| MF | ENG | Graham Fenton |
| MF | ENG | Steve Froggatt |
| MF | ENG | Christopher Pearce |
| MF | ENG | Lee Williams |
| FW | ENG | Martin Carruthers |

| Pos. | Nation | Player |
|---|---|---|
| FW | ENG | Garry Harrison |
| FW | ENG | Steven Morgan |
| FW | ENG | David Travis |
| FW | ENG | Ian Tyrrell |
| FW | ENG | Stephen Walker |
| | ENG | Darren Hedigan |
| | ENG | Shaun Hodgson |
| | ENG | Kevin Ibrahim |
| | ENG | Matthew McCallum |
| | ENG | Steven Pitcher |
| | ENG | Mark Pugh |
| | ENG | Brett Rose |
| | SCO | Scott McIntyre |
| | NIR | Phillip McNamara |
| | ENG | Paul Tomlinson |
| | IRL | Alan McLoughlin |

Schoolboys

The following players were attached to the club but did not play for the reserve or youth teams.

Note: Flags indicate national team as defined under FIFA eligibility rules; some limited exceptions apply. Players may hold more than one non-FIFA nationality.

| Pos. | Nation | Player |
|---|---|---|
| GK | IRL | Paul Flynn |
| DF | ENG | Darren Evans |
| DF | SCO | Graeme Williams |
| MF | ENG | Ian King |
| | ENG | Nicki Finney |
| | ENG | Otis Hutson |
| | | Keith Accison |
| | | Christopher Boyce |

| Pos. | Nation | Player |
|---|---|---|
| | | Trevor Carter |
| | | Justin Cope |
| | | David Ferry |
| | | James S. Green |
| | | Lee Hackett |
| | | Stuart James |
| | | Shaun Sweeney |
| | | Adrian Rampton |

== See also ==
- List of Aston Villa F.C. records and statistics
