= 1990–91 UEFA Cup =

20th season of Europe's secondary club football tournament organised by UEFA

Tournament details
- Dates: 18 September 1990 – 22 May 1991
- Teams: 64

Final positions
- Champions: (Italy) Inter Milan (1st title)
- Runners-up: (Italy) Roma

Tournament statistics
- Matches played: 126
- Goals scored: 288 (2.29 per match)
- Attendance: 2,407,258 (19,105 per match)
- Top scorer(s): Rudi Völler (Roma); 10 goals

The 1990–91 UEFA Cup was the 20th season of the UEFA Cup, the secondary club football competition organised by the Union of European Football Associations (UEFA). The final was played over two legs at San Siro, Milan, Italy, and at the Stadio Olimpico, Rome, Italy. The competition was won by Inter Milan, who defeated fellow Italian team Roma by an aggregate result of 2–1 to claim their first UEFA Cup title.

For the second consecutive year, two Italian teams reached the final of the UEFA Cup, This was the first European title for Inter Milan in 26 years, after their two consecutive European Cup triumphs in 1964 and 1965. This tournament also marked the return of English clubs, after a five-year ban resulting from the Heysel Stadium disaster in 1985.

== Association team allocation ==
A total of 64 teams from 32 UEFA member associations participated in the 1990–91 UEFA Cup, all entering from the first round over six knock-out rounds. The association ranking based on the UEFA country coefficients is used to determine the number of participating teams for each association:

- Associations 1–3 each have four teams qualify.
- Associations 4–8 each have three teams qualify.
- Associations 9–21 each have two teams qualify.
- Associations 22–32 each have one team qualify.

=== Association ranking ===
For the 1990–91 UEFA Cup, the associations are allocated places according to their 1989 UEFA country coefficients, which takes into account their performance in European competitions from 1984–85 to 1988–89. Having returned to European competitions after serving its five-year ban, England's score was limited to the first of the five seasons accounted for in the ranking, and only one English club competed in the UEFA Cup, from a previous total of four.

Association ranking for 1990–91 UEFA Cup

Rank	Association	Coeff.	Teams	Notes
1	Italy	42.498	4	
2	West Germany	41.093	4	
3	Spain	40.999	4	
4	Soviet Union	31.966	3	
5	Belgium	30.833	3	
6	Netherlands	27.050	3	
7	Portugal	25.583	3	
8	Romania	25.050	3	
9	Scotland	24.800	2	
10	Sweden	22.900	2	
11	France	22.800	2	
12	Yugoslavia	21.400	2	
13	Austria	20.000	2	
14	East Germany	20.000	2	
15	Czech Republic	16.550	2	
16	Hungary	16.500	2	
17	Greece	16.416	2	

Rank	Association	Coeff.	Teams	Notes
18	Switzerland	16.000	2	
19	Denmark	15.332	2	
-	Wales	15.000	0	
20	Finland	13.664	2	
21	Poland	13.250	2	
22	Bulgaria	12.916	1	
23	Turkey	11.665	1	
24	England	9.428	1	
25	Albania	8.666	1	
26	Norway	6.666	1	
27	Northern Ireland	5.666	1	
28	Cyprus	5.666	1	
28	Iceland	4.333	1	
30	Malta	2.666	1	
31	Republic of Ireland	2.665	1	
32	Luxembourg	1.665	1	

Wales: There was no national league in Wales before 1992 and the only competition organised by the Football Association of Wales was the Welsh Cup so Wales had just a single participant in European competitions, the winner (or best placed Welsh team as several English teams also competed) of the Welsh Cup which competed in the UEFA Cup Winners' Cup. Its virtual ranking is only an original research, because the UEFA country ranking was only used to allocate the UEFA Cup spots at time, so Wales was not included.

=== Teams ===
The labels in parentheses show how each team qualified for competition:

- TH: Title holders
- CW: Cup winners
- CR: Cup runners-up
- LC: League Cup winners
- 2nd, 3rd, 4th, 5th, 6th, etc.: League position
- P-W: End-of-season European competition play-offs winners

Qualified teams for 1990–91 UEFA Cup
(Italy) Inter Milan (3rd)	(Italy) Roma (6th)	(Italy) Atalanta (7th)	(Italy) Bologna (8th)
(West Germany) Köln (2nd)	(West Germany) Eintracht Frankfurt (3rd)	(West Germany) Borussia Dortmund (4th)	(West Germany) Bayer Leverkusen (5th)
(Spain) Valencia (2nd)	(Spain) Atlético Madrid (4th)	(Spain) Real Sociedad (5th)	(Spain) Sevilla (6th)
(Soviet Union) Dnipro Dnipropetrovsk (2nd)	(Soviet Union) Torpedo Moscow (5th)	(Soviet Union) Chornomorets Odesa (6th)	(Belgium) Anderlecht (2nd)
(Belgium) Mechelen (3rd)	(Belgium) Antwerp (4th)	(Netherlands) Twente (3rd)	(Netherlands) Vitesse (4th)
(Netherlands) Roda JC (5th)	(Portugal) Benfica (2nd)	(Portugal) Sporting CP (3rd)	(Portugal) Vitória Guimarães (4th)
(Romania) Universitatea Craiova (3rd)	(Romania) Petrolul Ploieşti (4th)	(Romania) Politehnica Timișoara (5th)	(Scotland) Heart of Midlothian (3rd)
(Scotland) Dundee United (4th)	(Sweden) Nörrkoping (2nd)	(Sweden) GAIS (3rd)	(France) Bordeaux (2nd)
(France) Monaco (3rd)	(Socialist Federal Republic of Yugoslavia) Dinamo Zagreb (2nd)	(Socialist Federal Republic of Yugoslavia) Partizan (4th)	(Austria) Rapid Wien (3rd)
(Austria) Admira Wacker (4th)	(East Germany) Chemnitzer FC (2nd)	(East Germany) Magdeburg (3rd)	(Czechoslovakia) Baník Ostrava (2nd)
(Czechoslovakia) Inter Bratislava (3rd)	(Hungary) MTK (2nd)	(Hungary) Ferencváros (3rd)	(Greece) PAOK (3rd)
(Greece) Iraklis (5th)	(Switzerland) Lausanne (2nd)	(Switzerland) Luzern (4th)	(Denmark) Brøndby (2nd)
(Denmark) Vejle (4th)	(Finland) TPS (2nd)	(Finland) RoPS (3rd)	(Poland) Zagłębie Lubin (2nd)
(Poland) Katowice (3rd)	(Bulgaria) Slavia Sofia (2nd)	(Turkey) Fenerbahçe (2nd)	(England) Aston Villa (2nd)
(Albania) Partizani (2nd)	(Norway) Rosenborg (2nd)	(Northern Ireland) Glenavon (2nd)	(Cyprus) Omonia (2nd)
(Iceland) FH (2nd)	(Malta) Hibernians (3rd)	(Republic of Ireland) Derry City (2nd)	(Luxembourg) Avenir Beggen (2nd)

Notes

1. Soviet Union (URS): Zalgiris Vilnius qualified for the UEFA Cup by finishing fourth in the 1989 Soviet Top League, but in March 1990, the team seceded from the Football Federation of the Soviet Union and relinquished its UEFA Cup placing after the country of Lithuania formally proclaimed its independence. Chornomorets Odesa, the next best team not already qualified for European competition, took its place in the UEFA Cup.
2. Yugoslavia: Hajduk Split finished third in the 1989–90 Yugoslav First League, but it was banned in November 1987 from entering any UEFA competition for two seasons, due to crowd trouble during the club's 1987–88 European Cup Winners' Cup second round return leg against Marseille, which came after repeated prior incidents at Hajduk's European home matches throughout early-to-mid 1980s. The ban was only enacted on seasons where Hadjuk Split would've qualified for European competition, with this being the second instance. Partizan, the next-best team not yet qualified for European competition, took its spot in the UEFA Cup.
3. East Germany (GDR): All matches of teams representing the DFV of East Germany, which qualified through the 1989–90 DDR-Oberliga, on or after German reunification of 3 October show the flag of the reunited nation of Germany. However, those matches and their records were still counted for East Germany, and not for Germany, under UEFA regulations.
4. Greece: AEK Athens finished second in the 1989–90 Alpha Ethniki, but it was punished with a one-year ban from all European competitions by UEFA, after AEK fans attacked Marseille's team bus on its way to the 1989–90 European Cup second round return leg in Athens. Iraklis, the next best team not already qualified for European competition, took its place in the UEFA Cup.

== Schedule ==
The schedule of the competition was as follows. Matches were scheduled for Wednesdays, though some matches exceptionally took place on Tuesdays or Thursdays.

Schedule for 1990–91 UEFA Cup
Round	First leg	Second leg
First round	18–20 September 1990	2–3 October 1990
Second round	23–24 October 1990	6–8 November 1990
Third round	28 November 1990	11–12 December 1990
Quarter-finals	6 March 1991	20 March 1991
Semi-finals	10 April 1991	24 April 1991
Final	8 May 1991	22 May 1991

== First round ==
Team 1	Agg.	Team 2	1st leg	2nd leg
Magdeburg (East Germany)	1–0	(Finland) RoPS	0–0	1–0
Roma (Italy)	2–0	(Portugal) Benfica	1–0	1–0
Aston Villa (England)	5–2	(Czechoslovakia) Baník Ostrava	3–1	2–1
Atalanta (Italy)	1–1 (a)	(Socialist Federal Republic of Yugoslavia) Dinamo Zagreb	0–0	1–1
Bayer Leverkusen (West Germany)	2–1	(Netherlands) Twente	1–0	1–1 (a.e.t.)
Borussia Dortmund (West Germany)	4–0	(East Germany) Chemnitzer FC	2–0	2–0
Brøndby (Denmark)	6–4	(West Germany) Eintracht Frankfurt	5–0	1–4
Derry City (Republic of Ireland)	0–1	(Netherlands) Vitesse	0–1	0–0
Avenir Beggen (Luxembourg)	2–6	(Czechoslovakia) Inter Bratislava	2–1	0–5
Chornomorets Odesa (Soviet Union)	4–3	(Norway) Rosenborg	3–1	1–2
Dnipro Dnipropetrovsk (Soviet Union)	2–4	(Scotland) Heart of Midlothian	1–1	1–3
Torpedo Moscow (Soviet Union)	5–2	(Sweden) GAIS	4–1	1–1
Politehnica Timișoara (Romania)	2–1	(Spain) Atlético Madrid	2–0	0–1
Fenerbahçe (Turkey)	6–2	(Portugal) Vitória Guimarães	3–0	3–2
FH (Iceland)	3–5	(Scotland) Dundee United	1–3	2–2
Katowice (Poland)	4–0	(Finland) TPS	3–0	1–0
Glenavon (Northern Ireland)	0–2	(France) Bordeaux	0–0	0–2
Hibernians (Malta)	0–5	(Socialist Federal Republic of Yugoslavia) Partizan	0–3	0–2
Norrköping (Sweden)	1–3	(West Germany) Köln	0–0	1–3
Iraklis (Greece)	0–2	(Spain) Valencia	0–0	0–2 (a.e.t.)
Partizani (Albania)	0–2	(Romania) Universitatea Craiova	0–1	0–1
Lausanne (Switzerland)	3–3 (a)	(Spain) Real Sociedad	3–2	0–1
MTK (Hungary)	2–3	(Switzerland) Luzern	1–1	1–2
Slavia Sofia (Bulgaria)	4–5	(Cyprus) Omonia	2–1	2–4 (a.e.t.)
Antwerp (Belgium)	1–3	(Hungary) Ferencváros	0–0	1–3 (a.e.t.)
Anderlecht (Belgium)	4–0	(Romania) Petrolul Ploiești	2–0	2–0
Roda JC (Netherlands)	2–6	(France) Monaco	1–3	1–3
Sevilla (Spain)	0–0 (4–3 p)	(Greece) PAOK	0–0	0–0 (a.e.t.)
Rapid Wien (Austria)	3–4	(Italy) Inter Milan	2–1	1–3 (a.e.t.)
Sporting CP (Portugal)	3–2	(Belgium) Mechelen	1–0	2–2
Vejle (Denmark)	0–4	(Austria) Admira Wacker	0–1	0–3
Zagłębie Lubin (Poland)	0–2	(Italy) Bologna	0–1	0–1

=== First leg ===
18 September 1990
14:45

Hibernians (Malta)	0–3	(Socialist Federal Republic of Yugoslavia) Partizan
	Report	Đurđević 16'; Đorđević 81'; Mijatović 89'

National Stadium, Ta' Qali
Attendance: 851
Referee: Ilias Karamanis (Greece)

18 September 1990
19:00

Glenavon (Northern Ireland)	0–0	(France) Bordeaux
	Report

Mourneview Park, Lurgan
Attendance: 3,250
Referee: Rune Pedersen (Norway)

18 September 1990
19:30

Avenir Beggen (Luxembourg)	2–1	(Czechoslovakia) Inter Bratislava
Krahen 33', 39'	Report	Stojka 2'

Stade rue Henri Dunant, Luxembourg
Attendance: 499
Referee: Hans Reijgwart (Netherlands)

18 September 1990
19:30

FH (Iceland)	1–3	(Scotland) Dundee United
B. Jónsson 2'	Report	Jackson 35'; Cleland 77'; B. Jónsson 89' (o.g.)

Kaplakriki, Hafnarfjörður
Attendance: 263
Referee: Patrick Kelly (Republic of Ireland)

18 September 1990
20:00

Borussia Dortmund (West Germany)	2–0	(East Germany) Chemnitzer FC
Helmer 20'; Mill 89'	Report

Westfalenstadion, Dortmund
Attendance: 30,124
Referee: Antonio Martín Navarrete (Spain)

18 September 1990
20:45

Roda JC (Netherlands)	1–3	(France) Monaco
Arnold 37'	Report	Weah 27'; Passi 43'; Dib 84'

Sportpark Kaalheide, Kerkrade
Attendance: 9,253
Referee: Rune Larsson (Sweden)

18 September 1990
22:00

Sporting CP (Portugal)	1–0	(Belgium) Mechelen
Cadete 37'	Report

Estádio José Alvalade, Lisbon
Attendance: 40,000
Referee: Kenny Hope (Scotland)

19 September 1990
18:00

1. FC Magdeburg (East Germany)	0–0	(Finland) RoPS
	Report

Ernst-Grube-Stadion, Magdeburg
Attendance: 3,000
Referee: Jim McCluskey (Scotland)

19 September 1990
20:30

Roma (Italy)	1–0	(Portugal) Benfica
Carnevale 1'	Report

Stadio Olimpico, Rome
Attendance: 59,074
Referee: Kurt Röthlisberger (Switzerland)

19 September 1990
20:30

Aston Villa (England)	3–1	(Czechoslovakia) Baník Ostrava
Platt 32'; Mountfield 57'; Olney 79'	Report	Chýlek 31'

Villa Park, Birmingham
Attendance: 27,317
Referee: Manfred Neuner (West Germany)

19 September 1990
18:00

Atalanta (Italy)	0–0	(Socialist Federal Republic of Yugoslavia) Dinamo Zagreb
	Report

Stadio Comunale, Bergamo
Attendance: 29,033
Referee: Peter Mikkelsen (Denmark)

19 September 1990
18:30

Bayer Leverkusen (West Germany)	1–0	(Netherlands) Twente
Kirsten 40'	Report

Ulrich-Haberland-Stadion, Leverkusen
Attendance: 10,100
Referee: Keith Cooper (Wales)

19 September 1990
19:00

Brøndby (Denmark)	5–0	(West Germany) Eintracht Frankfurt
Okechukwu 9'; Christensen 54', 83'; Christofte 63' (pen.); Madsen 79'	Report

Københavns Idrætspark, Copenhagen
Attendance: 12,400
Referee: Andrew Waddell (Scotland)

19 September 1990
20:30

Derry City (Republic of Ireland)	0–1	(Netherlands) Vitesse
	Report	Loeffen 18'

Brandywell Stadium, Derry
Attendance: 2,878
Referee: Alain Delmer (France)

19 September 1990
18:00

Chornomorets Odesa (Soviet Union)	3–1	(Norway) Rosenborg
Tsymbalar 3'; Hetsko 48'; Kondratiev 58'	Report	Sørloth 78' (pen.)

Central Stadium Chornomorets, Odesa
Attendance: 17,500
Referee: Stefanos Hatzistefanou (Cyprus)

19 September 1990
18:00

Dnipro Dnipropetrovsk (Soviet Union)	1–1	(Scotland) Heart of Midlothian
Hudymenko 54'	Report	Robertson 22'

Meteor Stadium, Dnipropetrovsk
Attendance: 15,500
Referee: Werner Föckler (West Germany)

19 September 1990
17:00

Torpedo Moscow (Soviet Union)	4–1	(Sweden) GAIS
Gitselov 15'; Tishkov 27', 32'; Grishin 44'	Report	Göransson 76'

Torpedo Stadium, Moscow
Attendance: 3,200
Referee: Stavros Zakestidis (Greece)

19 September 1990
14:45

Politehnica Timișoara (Romania)	2–0	(Spain) Atlético Madrid
Bungău 43' (pen.); Popescu 62'	Report

Stadionul Politehnica, Timișoara
Attendance: 20,000
Referee: Yusuf Namoğlu (Turkey)

19 September 1990
19:00

Fenerbahçe (Turkey)	3–0	(Portugal) Vitória Guimarães
Vokrri 35'; Sofuoğlu 40'; Çorlu 63' (pen.)	Report

BJK İnönü Stadium, Istanbul
Attendance: 23,035
Referee: Ivan Grégr (Czechoslovakia)

19 September 1990
17:30

GKS Katowice (Poland)	3–0	(Finland) TPS
Heikkinen 18' (o.g.); Strojek 54'; Prabucki 81'	Report

Stadion GKS Katowice, Katowice
Attendance: 3,030
Referee: Erman Toroğlu (Turkey)

19 September 1990
19:00

IFK Norrköping (Sweden)	0–0	(West Germany) Köln
	Report

Norrköpings Idrottspark, Norrköping
Attendance: 10,403
Referee: Marcel Van Langenhove (Belgium)

19 September 1990
18:45

Iraklis (Greece)	0–0	(Spain) Valencia
	Report

Kaftanzoglio Stadium, Thessaloniki
Attendance: 14,500
Referee: Michel Girard (France)

19 September 1990
16:30

Partizani (Albania)	0–1	(Romania) Universitatea Craiova
	Report	Ciurea 86'

Qemal Stafa Stadium, Tirana
Attendance: 10,200
Referee: Michel Vautrot (France)

19 September 1990
20:00

Lausanne (Switzerland)	3–2	(Spain) Real Sociedad
Hottiger 50', 89'; Chapuisat 77'	Report	Lumbreras 16'; Gajate 27'

Stade Olympique de la Pontaise, Lausanne
Attendance: 20,600
Referee: Manfred Roßner (East Germany)

19 September 1990
17:00

MTK (Hungary)	1–1	(Switzerland) Luzern
Cservenkai 44'	Report	Knup 16'

Hungária körúti stadion, Budapest
Attendance: 1,480
Referee: Rodger Gifford (Wales)

19 September 1990
19:00

Slavia Sofia (Bulgaria)	2–1	(Cyprus) Omonia
Petkov 5'; Ignatov 82'	Report	Mičinec 68'

Stadion Slavia, Sofia
Attendance: 2,061
Referee: Vladimir Chekhoiev (Soviet Union)

19 September 1990
20:00

Anderlecht (Belgium)	2–0	(Romania) Petrolul Ploiești
Verheyen 64'; Nilis 85' (pen.)	Report

Constant Vanden Stock Stadium, Brussels
Attendance: 6,750
Referee: Emilio Soriano Aladrén (Spain)

19 September 1990
20:45

Sevilla (Spain)	0–0	(Greece) PAOK
	Report

Estadio Ramón Sánchez-Pizjuán, Seville
Attendance: 35,000
Referee: Helmut Kohl (Austria)

19 September 1990
19:30

Rapid Wien (Austria)	2–1	(Italy) Inter Milan
Pfeifenberger 55'; Keglevits 71'	Report	Matthäus 5'

Gerhard-Hanappi-Stadion, Vienna
Attendance: 12,000
Referee: Joël Quiniou (France)

19 September 1990
19:00

Vejle (Denmark)	0–1	(Austria) Admira Wacker
	Report	Binder 66'

Vejle Stadion, Vejle
Attendance: 2,373
Referee: Leif Sundell (Sweden)

19 September 1990
15:00

Zagłębie Lubin (Poland)	0–1	(Italy) Bologna
	Report	Bonini 78'

Stadion Zagłębia Lubin, Lubin
Attendance: 10,032
Referee: Henning Lund-Sørensen (Denmark)

20 September 1990
20:00

Antwerp (Belgium)	0–0	(Hungary) Ferencváros
	Report

Bosuilstadion, Antwerp
Attendance: 4,571
Referee: Carlos Silva Valente (Portugal)

=== Second leg ===
2 October 1990
18:00

Chemnitzer FC (East Germany)	0–2	(West Germany) Borussia Dortmund
	Report	Helmer 24'; Rummenigge 50'

Ernst-Thälmann-Stadion, Chemnitz
Attendance: 11,904
Referee: Keith Hackett (England)

Borussia Dortmund won 4–0 on aggregate.

2 October 1990
19:15

Real Sociedad (Spain)	1–0	(Switzerland) Lausanne
Aldridge 55'	Report

Atotxa, San Sebastián
Attendance: 18,725
Referee: Gérard Biguet (France)

3–3 on aggregate; Real Sociedad won on away goals.

2 October 1990
19:30

Admira Wacker (Austria)	3–0	(Denmark) Vejle
Binder 17'; Marschall 27'; Ogris 45'	Report

Bundesstadion Südstadt, Maria Enzersdorf
Attendance: 2,000
Referee: Mircea Salomir (Romania)

Admira Wacker won 4–0 on aggregate.

2 October 1990
20:00

Luzern (Switzerland)	2–1	(Hungary) MTK
Van Eck 54'; Nadig 80'	Report	Kardos 70'

Stadion Allmend, Lucerne
Attendance: 10,350
Referee: Ildefonso Urizar Azpitarte (Spain)

Luzern won 3–2 on aggregate.

2 October 1990
20:30

Vitesse (Netherlands)	0–0	(Republic of Ireland) Derry City
	Report

Nieuw Monnikenhuize, Arnhem
Attendance: 5,742
Referee: Joaquín Urío Velázquez (Spain)

Vitesse won 1–0 on aggregate.

2 October 1990
20:45

Bordeaux (France)	2–0	(Northern Ireland) Glenavon
Dugarry 4'; Ferreri 9'	Report

Stade du Parc Lescure, Bordeaux
Attendance: 11,385
Referee: Raúl García de Loza (Spain)

Bordeaux won 2–0 on aggregate.

3 October 1990
14:00

RoPS (Finland)	0–1	(Germany) 1. FC Magdeburg
	Report	Laeßig 4'

Rovaniemen keskuskenttä, Rovaniemi
Attendance: 3,645
Referee: Vadim Zhuk (Soviet Union)

1. FC Magdeburg won 1–0 on aggregate.

3 October 1990
22:00

Benfica (Portugal)	0–1	(Italy) Roma
	Report	Giannini 27'

Estádio da Luz, Lisbon
Attendance: 60,000
Referee: Aron Schmidhuber (Germany)

Roma won 2–0 on aggregate.

3 October 1990
19:00

Baník Ostrava (Czechoslovakia)	1–2	(England) Aston Villa
Nečas 42'	Report	Mountfield 52'; Staš 59' (o.g.)

Bazaly, Ostrava
Attendance: 13,544
Referee: Tullio Lanese (Italy)

Aston Villa won 5–2 on aggregate.

3 October 1990
18:15

Dinamo Zagreb (Socialist Federal Republic of Yugoslavia)	1–1	(Italy) Atalanta
Boban 54'	Report	Evair 60' (pen.)

Stadion Maksimir, Zagreb
Attendance: 19,488
Referee: Siegfried Kirschen (Germany)

1–1 on aggregate; Atalanta won on away goals.

3 October 1990
19:00

Twente (Netherlands)	1–1 (a.e.t.)	(Germany) Bayer Leverkusen
Paus 85'	Report	Kirsten 96'

Diekman Stadion, Enschede
Attendance: 14,000
Referee: Sándor Varga (Hungary)

Bayer Leverkusen won 2–1 on aggregate.

3 October 1990
20:00

Eintracht Frankfurt (Germany)	4–1	(Denmark) Brøndby
Yeboah 5'; Eckstein 22'; Bein 37'; Möller 86' (pen.)	Report	Christensen 28'

Waldstadion, Frankfurt
Attendance: 12,000
Referee: Valeri Butenko (Soviet Union)

Brøndby won 6–4 on aggregate.

3 October 1990
17:00

Inter Bratislava (Czechoslovakia)	5–0	(Luxembourg) Avenir Beggen
Kubica 5'; Stojka 14'; Juraško 50' (pen.), 58' (pen.); Weiss 83'	Report

Štadión Pasienky, Bratislava
Attendance: 1,089
Referee: Kazimierz Orłowski (Poland)

Inter Bratislava won 6–2 on aggregate.

3 October 1990
19:00

Rosenborg (Norway)	2–1	(Soviet Union) Chornomorets Odesa
Jakobsen 28'; Sollied 76'	Report	Shelepnytskyi 38'

Lerkendal Stadion, Trondheim
Attendance: 14,440
Referee: Håkan Lundgren (Sweden)

Chornomorets Odesa won 4–3 on aggregate.

3 October 1990
20:30

Heart of Midlothian (Scotland)	3–1	(Soviet Union) Dnipro Dnipropetrovsk
McPherson 20'; Robertson 21' (pen.), 41'	Report	Shakhov 40' (pen.)

Tynecastle Park, Edinburgh
Attendance: 18,760
Referee: Einar Halle (Norway)

Heart of Midlothian won 4–2 on aggregate.

3 October 1990
19:00

GAIS (Sweden)	1–1	(Soviet Union) Torpedo Moscow
Köhl 67'	Report	Tishkov 41'

Ullevi, Gothenburg
Attendance: 3,725
Referee: Karl-Heinz Tritschler (Germany)

Torpedo Moscow won 5–2 on aggregate.

3 October 1990
20:00

Atlético Madrid (Spain)	1–0	(Romania) Politehnica Timișoara
Juanito 89'	Report

Estadio Vicente Calderón, Madrid
Attendance: 58,200
Referee: Frans Van Den Wijngaert (Belgium)

Politehnica Timișoara won 2–1 on aggregate.

3 October 1990
22:00

Vitória Guimarães (Portugal)	2–3	(Turkey) Fenerbahçe
José Soeiro 32'; Basaula 77'	Report	Germano 6' (o.g.); Müjdat 10'; Aykut 25'

Estádio D. Afonso Henriques, Guimarães
Attendance: 5,000
Referee: Rosario Lo Bello (Italy)

Fenerbahçe won 6–2 on aggregate.

3 October 1990
20:30

Dundee United (Scotland)	2–2	(Iceland) FH
Connolly 63'; Hilmarsson 78' (o.g.)	Report	Magnússon 19'; Gíslason 28'

Tannadice Park, Dundee
Attendance: 5,475
Referee: Norman Loughins (Northern Ireland)

Dundee United won 5–3 on aggregate.

3 October 1990
18:00

TPS (Finland)	0–1	(Poland) GKS Katowice
	Report	Szewczyk 27'

Kupittaan jalkapallostadion, Turku
Attendance: 1,171
Referee: Bernd Heynemann (Germany)

GKS Katowice won 4–0 on aggregate.

3 October 1990
17:00

Partizan (Socialist Federal Republic of Yugoslavia)	2–0	(Malta) Hibernians
Stevanović 26'; Šćepović 80'	Report

Partizan Stadium, Belgrade
Attendance: 9,651
Referee: Loizos Loizou (Cyprus)

Partizan won 5–0 on aggregate.

3 October 1990
18:30

Köln (Germany)	3–1	(Sweden) IFK Norrköping
Higl 49'; Banach 72'; Ordenewitz 78'	Report	Hellström 20'

Müngersdorfer Stadion, Cologne
Attendance: 9,200
Referee: Lajos Hartmann (Hungary)

Köln won 3–1 on aggregate.

3 October 1990
22:00

Valencia (Spain)	2–0 (a.e.t.)	(Greece) Iraklis
Fernando 101'; Cuxart 108'	Report

Estadio Luis Casanova, Valencia
Attendance: 27,500
Referee: Brian Hill (England)

Valencia won 2–0 on aggregate.

3 October 1990
13:30

Universitatea Craiova (Romania)	1–0	(Albania) Partizani
Zamfir 78'	Report

Stadionul Central, Craiova
Attendance: 10,760
Referee: Ray Lewis (England)

Universitatea Craiova won 2–0 on aggregate.

3 October 1990
19:00

Omonia (Cyprus)	4–2 (a.e.t.)	(Bulgaria) Slavia Sofia
Mičinec 3' (pen.); Xiourouppas 51'; Kalotheou 109', 118'	Report	Kirov 10'; Dermendzhiev 110' (pen.)

Makario Stadium, Nicosia
Attendance: 17,000
Referee: Branko Bujić (Yugoslavia)

Omonia won 5–4 on aggregate.

3 October 1990
16:30

Ferencváros (Hungary)	3–1 (a.e.t.)	(Belgium) Antwerp
Keresztúri 93'; Topor 102'; Fischer 111'	Report	Van Rooij 104' (pen.)

ZTE Aréna, Zalaegerszeg
Attendance: 11,809
Referee: Pierluigi Magni (Italy)

Ferencváros won 3–1 on aggregate.

3 October 1990
14:00

Petrolul Ploiești (Romania)	0–2	(Belgium) Anderlecht
	Report	Nilis 22', 88'

Stadionul Petrolul, Ploiești
Attendance: 6,000
Referee: Heinz Holzmann (Austria)

Anderlecht won 4–0 on aggregate.

3 October 1990
20:00

Monaco (France)	3–1	(Netherlands) Roda JC
Weah 35'; Passi 65'; Díaz 84'	Report	Jansen 87'

Stade Louis II, Monaco
Attendance: 4,824
Referee: Allan Gunn (England)

Monaco won 6–2 on aggregate.

3 October 1990
19:30

PAOK (Greece)	0–0 (a.e.t.)	(Spain) Sevilla
	Report
Penalties
Skartados (penalty missed); Karageorgiou (penalty scored); Toursounidis (penalty scored); I. Hassan (penalty scored); Tolba (penalty missed)	3–4	(penalty missed) Bengoechea; (penalty scored) Salguero; (penalty scored) Polster; (penalty scored) Serrano; (penalty scored) Diego

Toumba Stadium, Thessaloniki
Attendance: 31,425
Referee: Bo Karlsson (Sweden)

0–0 on aggregate; Sevilla won 4–3 on penalties.

3 October 1990
20:30

Inter Milan (Italy)	3–1 (a.e.t.)	(Austria) Rapid Wien
Berti 67', 84'; Klinsmann 101'	Report	Weber 88'

Stadio Marcantonio Bentegodi, Verona
Attendance: 27,647
Referee: George Courtney (England)

Inter Milan won 4–3 on aggregate.

3 October 1990
20:00

Mechelen (Belgium)	2–2	(Portugal) Sporting CP
Albert 8'; Carlos Xavier 55' (o.g.)	Report	Gomes 30'; Cadete 81'

Achter de Kazerne, Mechelen
Attendance: 6,325
Referee: Pietro D'Elia (Italy)

Sporting CP won 3–2 on aggregate.

3 October 1990
20:30

Bologna (Italy)	1–0	(Poland) Zagłębie Lubin
Di Già 90'	Report

Stadio Renato Dall'Ara, Bologna
Attendance: 7,749
Referee: Rolf Blattmann (Switzerland)

Bologna won 2–0 on aggregate.

== Second round ==
Team 1	Agg.	Team 2	1st leg	2nd leg
Köln (Germany)	2–1	(Czechoslovakia) Inter Bratislava	0–1	2–0
Magdeburg (Germany)	0–2	(France) Bordeaux	0–1	0–1
Omonia (Cyprus)	1–4	(Belgium) Anderlecht	1–1	0–3
Aston Villa (England)	2–3	(Italy) Inter Milan	2–0	0–3
Brøndby (Denmark)	4–0	(Hungary) Ferencváros	3–0	1–0
Chornomorets Odesa (Soviet Union)	0–1	(France) Monaco	0–0	0–1
Luzern (Switzerland)	1–2	(Austria) Admira Wacker	0–1	1–1
Torpedo Moscow (Soviet Union)	4–3	(Spain) Sevilla	3–1	1–2
Universitatea Craiova (Romania)	0–4	(Germany) Borussia Dortmund	0–3	0–1
Fenerbahçe (Turkey)	1–5	(Italy) Atalanta	0–1	1–4
Katowice (Poland)	1–6	(Germany) Bayer Leverkusen	1–2	0–4
Heart of Midlothian (Scotland)	3–4	(Italy) Bologna	3–1	0–3
Real Sociedad (Spain)	1–1 (3–4 p)	(Socialist Federal Republic of Yugoslavia) Partizan	1–0	0–1 (a.e.t.)
Sporting CP (Portugal)	7–2	(Romania) Politehnica Timișoara	7–0	0–2
Valencia (Spain)	2–3	(Italy) Roma	1–1	1–2
Vitesse (Netherlands)	5–0	(Scotland) Dundee United	1–0	4–0

=== First leg ===
23 October 1990
17:30

1. FC Magdeburg (Germany)	0–1	(France) Bordeaux
	Report	Ferreri 45' (pen.)

Ernst-Grube-Stadion, Magdeburg
Attendance: 6,758
Referee: Heinz Holzmann (Austria)

24 October 1990
20:15

Köln (Germany)	0–1	(Czechoslovakia) Inter Bratislava
	Report	Obšitník 84'

Müngersdorfer Stadion, Cologne
Attendance: 8,000
Referee: Michał Listkiewicz (Poland)

24 October 1990
17:30

Omonia (Cyprus)	1–1	(Belgium) Anderlecht
Mavroftis 83'	Report	Christofi 51' (o.g.)

Makario Stadium, Nicosia
Attendance: 9,473
Referee: Roger Philippi (Luxembourg)

24 October 1990
21:00

Aston Villa (England)	2–0	(Italy) Inter Milan
Nielsen 14'; Platt 67'	Report

Villa Park, Birmingham
Attendance: 36,461
Referee: Lajos Németh (Hungary)

24 October 1990
19:00

Brøndby (Denmark)	3–0	(Hungary) Ferencváros
Christofte 29' (pen.); Okechukwu 81'; Vilfort 90'	Report

Københavns Idrætspark, Copenhagen
Attendance: 14,100
Referee: Keith Cooper (Wales)

24 October 1990
16:00

Chornomorets Odesa (Soviet Union)	0–0	(France) Monaco
	Report

Central Stadium Chornomorets, Odesa
Attendance: 25,000
Referee: Alphonse Costantin (Belgium)

24 October 1990
20:00

Luzern (Switzerland)	0–1	(Austria) Admira Wacker
	Report	Binder 71'

Stadion Allmend, Lucerne
Attendance: 9,500
Referee: Ivan Grégr (Czechoslovakia)

24 October 1990
17:00

Torpedo Moscow (Soviet Union)	3–1	(Spain) Sevilla
Tishkov 58'; Zhukov 84' (pen.); Shirinbekov 89'	Report	Polster 71'

Torpedo Stadium, Moscow
Attendance: 5,800
Referee: Rune Larsson (Sweden)

24 October 1990
13:30

Universitatea Craiova (Romania)	0–3	(Germany) Borussia Dortmund
	Report	Zorc 59'; Mill 69', 78'

Stadionul Central, Craiova
Attendance: 25,000
Referee: Carlo Longhi (Italy)

24 October 1990
20:00

Fenerbahçe (Turkey)	0–1	(Italy) Atalanta
	Report	Bonacina 43'

Fenerbahçe Stadium, Istanbul
Attendance: 22,617
Referee: Kurt Röthlisberger (Switzerland)

24 October 1990
17:30

GKS Katowice (Poland)	1–2	(Germany) Bayer Leverkusen
P. Świerczewski 85'	Report	Thom 27'; Buncol 48'

Stadion GKS Katowice, Katowice
Attendance: 4,833
Referee: Yusuf Namoğlu (Turkey)

24 October 1990
20:30

Heart of Midlothian (Scotland)	3–1	(Italy) Bologna
Foster 7', 24'; I. Ferguson 38'	Report	Notaristefano 60'

Tynecastle Stadium, Edinburgh
Attendance: 11,155
Referee: José María Enríquez Negreira (Spain)

24 October 1990
19:15

Real Sociedad (Spain)	1–0	(Socialist Federal Republic of Yugoslavia) Partizan
Larrañaga 90'	Report

Atotxa, San Sebastián
Attendance: 16,875
Referee: Peter Mikkelsen (Denmark)

24 October 1990
22:30

Sporting CP (Portugal)	7–0	(Romania) Politehnica Timișoara
Cadete 31', 50', 70'; Gomes 36', 61'; Careca 79'; Bozinovski 90'	Report

Estádio José Alvalade, Lisbon
Attendance: 32,000
Referee: Hans-Peter Dellwing (Germany)

24 October 1990
21:00

Valencia (Spain)	1–1	(Italy) Roma
Roberto 24'	Report	Rizzitelli 73'

Estadio Luís Casanova, Valencia
Attendance: 37,400
Referee: Siegfried Kirschen (Germany)

24 October 1990
20:30

Vitesse (Netherlands)	1–0	(Scotland) Dundee United
Eijer 30'	Report

Nieuw Monnikenhuize, Arnhem
Attendance: 8,331
Referee: Mircea Salomir (Romania)

=== Second leg ===
6 November 1990
17:00

Inter Bratislava (Czechoslovakia)	0–2	(Germany) Köln
	Report	Götz 56'; Janßen 62'

Štadión Petržalka, Bratislava
Attendance: 9,906
Referee: José Rosa dos Santos (Portugal)

Köln won 2–1 on aggregate.

6 November 1990
20:00

Borussia Dortmund (Germany)	1–0	(Romania) Universitatea Craiova
Zorc 39'	Report

Westfalenstadion, Dortmund
Attendance: 20,117
Referee: Dimitar Dimitrov (Bulgaria)

Borussia Dortmund won 4–0 on aggregate.

6 November 1990
20:45

Bordeaux (France)	1–0	(Germany) 1. FC Magdeburg
Ferreri 57'	Report

Stade du Parc Lescure, Bordeaux
Attendance: 17,000
Referee: Pierluigi Pairetto (Italy)

Bordeaux won 2–0 on aggregate.

7 November 1990
20:00

Anderlecht (Belgium)	3–0	(Cyprus) Omonia
Verheyen 5'; Oliveira 38' (pen.); Rutjes 60'	Report

Constant Vanden Stock Stadium, Brussels
Attendance: 6,604
Referee: Óli Olsen (Iceland)

Anderlecht won 4–1 on aggregate.

7 November 1990
20:30

Inter Milan (Italy)	3–0	(England) Aston Villa
Klinsmann 7'; Berti 64'; Bianchi 75'	Report

San Siro, Milan
Attendance: 75,585
Referee: Alexey Spirin (Soviet Union)

Inter Milan won 3–2 on aggregate.

7 November 1990
18:00

Ferencváros (Hungary)	0–1	(Denmark) Brøndby
	Report	Christensen 79'

Üllői úti Stadion, Budapest
Attendance: 0
Referee: Michel Vautrot (France)

Brøndby won 4–0 on aggregate.

7 November 1990
19:15

Monaco (France)	1–0	(Soviet Union) Chornomorets Odesa
Weah 14'	Report

Stade Louis II, Monaco
Attendance: 6,321
Referee: Kenny Hope (Scotland)

Monaco won 1–0 on aggregate.

7 November 1990
19:30

Admira Wacker (Austria)	1–1	(Switzerland) Luzern
Marschall 51'	Report	Marini 88'

Bundesstadion Südstadt, Maria Enzersdorf
Attendance: 3,286
Referee: Vadim Zhuk (Soviet Union)

Admira Wacker won 2–1 on aggregate.

7 November 1990
21:45

Sevilla (Spain)	2–1	(Soviet Union) Torpedo Moscow
Bengoechea 25'; Ramón 62'	Report	Savichev 9'

Estadio Ramón Sánchez-Pizjuán, Seville
Attendance: 26,700
Referee: Pierluigi Magni (Italy)

Torpedo Moscow won 4–3 on aggregate.

7 November 1990
19:00

Atalanta (Italy)	4–1	(Turkey) Fenerbahçe
Evair 2'; Perrone 55'; Nicolini 57'; Bonacina 61'	Report	İsmail 90'

Stadio Comunale, Bergamo
Attendance: 14,972
Referee: Karl-Josef Assenmacher (Germany)

Atalanta won 5–1 on aggregate.

7 November 1990
20:15

Bayer Leverkusen (Germany)	4–0	(Poland) GKS Katowice
Leśniak 28'; Jorginho 78'; Herrlich 82'; Schreier 88'	Report

Ulrich-Haberland-Stadion, Leverkusen
Attendance: 8,700
Referee: Kaj Natri (Finland)

Bayer Leverkusen won 6–1 on aggregate.

7 November 1990
20:30

Bologna (Italy)	3–0	(Scotland) Heart of Midlothian
Détári 19'; R. Villa 73'; Mariani 84'	Report

Stadio Renato Dall'Ara, Bologna
Attendance: 12,224
Referee: Ignace van Swieten (Netherlands)

Bologna won 4–3 on aggregate.

7 November 1990
13:00

Politehnica Timișoara (Romania)	2–0	(Portugal) Sporting CP
Vlaicu 44'; Varga 52' (pen.)	Report

Stadionul Politehnica, Timișoara
Attendance: 20,000
Referee: Serge Muhmenthaler (Switzerland)

Sporting CP won 7–2 on aggregate.

7 November 1990
20:30

Roma (Italy)	2–1	(Spain) Valencia
Giannini 36'; Völler 64' (pen.)	Report	Fernando 70' (pen.)

Stadio Olimpico, Rome
Attendance: 47,825
Referee: Gérard Biguet (France)

Roma won 3–2 on aggregate.

7 November 1990
20:45

Dundee United (Scotland)	0–4	(Netherlands) Vitesse
	Report	Latuheru 10', 37'; Van den Brom 62' (pen.); Eijer 73'

Tannadice Park, Dundee
Attendance: 10,261
Referee: Bernd Heynemann (Germany)

Vitesse won 5–0 on aggregate.

8 November 1990
19:15

Partizan (Socialist Federal Republic of Yugoslavia)	1–0 (a.e.t.)	(Spain) Real Sociedad
Stevanović 48'	Report
Penalties
Višnjić (penalty scored); Vujačić (penalty scored); Petrić (penalty scored); Đurđević (penalty scored); Šćepović (penalty missed)	4–3	(penalty scored) Menchaca; (penalty scored) Lasa; (penalty scored) Górriz; (penalty missed) Aldridge; (penalty missed) Bengoechea

Partizan Stadium, Belgrade
Attendance: 23,324
Referee: Rosario Lo Bello (Italy)

1–1 on aggregate; Partizan won 4–3 on penalties.

== Third round ==
Team 1	Agg.	Team 2	1st leg	2nd leg
Köln (Germany)	1–2	(Italy) Atalanta	1–1	0–1
Roma (Italy)	7–0	(France) Bordeaux	5–0	2–0
Brøndby (Denmark)	3–0	(Germany) Bayer Leverkusen	3–0	0–0
Torpedo Moscow (Soviet Union)	4–2	(France) Monaco	2–1	2–1
Inter Milan (Italy)	4–1	(Socialist Federal Republic of Yugoslavia) Partizan	3–0	1–1
Anderlecht (Belgium)	2–2 (a)	(Germany) Borussia Dortmund	1–0	1–2
Admira Wacker (Austria)	3–3 (5–6 p)	(Italy) Bologna	3–0	0–3 (a.e.t.)
Vitesse (Netherlands)	1–4	(Portugal) Sporting CP	0–2	1–2

=== First leg ===
28 November 1990
20:15

Köln (Germany)	1–1	(Italy) Atalanta
Progna 49' (o.g.)	Report	Bordin 54'

Müngersdorfer Stadion, Cologne
Attendance: 24,500
Referee: Guy Goethals (Belgium)

28 November 1990
20:30

Roma (Italy)	5–0	(France) Bordeaux
Völler 10', 45' (pen.), 50'; Gerolin 61', 74'	Report

Stadio Olimpico, Rome
Attendance: 48,699
Referee: John Blankenstein (Netherlands)

28 November 1990
19:00

Brøndby (Denmark)	3–0	(Germany) Bayer Leverkusen
Frank 5', 66'; Christensen 60'	Report

Københavns Idrætspark, Copenhagen
Attendance: 23,000
Referee: Alexey Spirin (Soviet Union)

28 November 1990
14:00

Torpedo Moscow (Soviet Union)	2–1	(France) Monaco
Tishkov 19'; Savichev 45'	Report	Passi 56'

Torpedo Stadium, Moscow
Attendance: 10,000
Referee: Kurt Röthlisberger (Switzerland)

28 November 1990
20:30

Inter Milan (Italy)	3–0	(Socialist Federal Republic of Yugoslavia) Partizan
Matthäus 32'; Mandorlini 47'; Bianchi 68'	Report

San Siro, Milan
Attendance: 63,071
Referee: Helmut Kohl (Austria)

28 November 1990
20:00

Anderlecht (Belgium)	1–0	(Germany) Borussia Dortmund
Van Der Linden 74'	Report

Constant Vanden Stock Stadium, Brussels
Attendance: 25,500
Referee: José Rosa dos Santos (Portugal)

28 November 1990
19:00

Admira Wacker (Austria)	3–0	(Italy) Bologna
Gretschnig 31', 55'; Müller 35'	Report

Bundesstadion Südstadt, Maria Enzersdorf
Attendance: 6,800
Referee: Lajos Hartmann (Hungary)

28 November 1990
20:30

Vitesse (Netherlands)	0–2	(Portugal) Sporting CP
	Report	Carlos Xavier 24'; Gomes 37'

Nieuw Monnikenhuize, Arnhem
Attendance: 10,729
Referee: Peter Mikkelsen (Denmark)

=== Second leg ===
11 December 1990
20:15

Bayer Leverkusen (Germany)	0–0	(Denmark) Brøndby
	Report

Ulrich-Haberland-Stadion, Leverkusen
Attendance: 11,000
Referee: Joaquín Ramos Marcos (Spain)

Brøndby won 3–0 on aggregate.

11 December 1990
20:30

Monaco (France)	1–2	(Soviet Union) Torpedo Moscow
Díaz 82'	Report	Tishkov 70'; Gitselov 90'

Stade Louis II, Monaco
Attendance: 11,465
Referee: Tullio Lanese (Italy)

Torpedo Moscow won 4–2 on aggregate.

12 December 1990
20:30

Atalanta (Italy)	1–0	(Germany) Köln
Nicolini 16'	Report

Stadio Comunale, Bergamo
Attendance: 20,309
Referee: Joël Quiniou (France)

Atalanta won 2–1 on aggregate.

12 December 1990
20:45

Bordeaux (France)	0–2	(Italy) Roma
	Report	Völler 72' (pen.); Desideri 89'

Stade du Parc Lescure, Bordeaux
Attendance: 7,549
Referee: Bo Karlsson (Sweden)

Roma won 7–0 on aggregate.

12 December 1990
18:30

Partizan (Socialist Federal Republic of Yugoslavia)	1–1	(Italy) Inter Milan
Stevanović 62'	Report	Matthäus 64'

Partizan Stadium, Belgrade
Attendance: 23,006
Referee: Michel Vautrot (France)

Inter Milan won 4–1 on aggregate.

12 December 1990
20:15

Borussia Dortmund (Germany)	2–1	(Belgium) Anderlecht
Gorlukovich 49'; Schulz 79'	Report	Van Baekel 36'

Westfalenstadion, Dortmund
Attendance: 36,400
Referee: Zoran Petrović (Yugoslavia)

2–2 on aggregate; Anderlecht won on away goals.

12 December 1990
16:30

Bologna (Italy)	3–0 (a.e.t.)	(Austria) Admira Wacker
Waas 6'; Cabrini 50' (pen.); Negro 70'	Report
Penalties
Tricella (penalty missed); Bonini (penalty scored); Verga (penalty scored); Waas (penalty scored); Cabrini (penalty missed); Notaristefano (penalty scored); Biondo (penalty scored); Lorenzo (penalty scored)	6–5	(penalty scored) Marschall; (penalty missed) Elsner; (penalty scored) Müller; (penalty scored) Gramann; (penalty missed) Degeorgi; (penalty scored) Artner; (penalty scored) Binder; (penalty missed) Dötzl

Stadio Renato Dall'Ara, Bologna
Attendance: 4,290
Referee: Karl-Heinz Tritschler (Germany)

3–3 aggregate; Bologna won 6–5 on penalties.

12 December 1990
22:30

Sporting CP (Portugal)	2–1	(Netherlands) Vitesse
Douglas 26', 67'	Report	Van Arum 78'

Estádio José Alvalade, Lisbon
Attendance: 30,000
Referee: George Courtney (England)

Sporting CP won 4–1 on aggregate.

== Quarter-finals ==
Team 1	Agg.	Team 2	1st leg	2nd leg
Roma (Italy)	6–2	(Belgium) Anderlecht	3–0	3–2
Atalanta (Italy)	0–2	(Italy) Inter Milan	0–0	0–2
Bologna (Italy)	1–3	(Portugal) Sporting CP	1–1	0–2
Brøndby (Denmark)	1–1 (4–2 p)	(Soviet Union) Torpedo Moscow	1–0	0–1 (a.e.t.)

=== First leg ===
6 March 1991
19:00

Roma (Italy)	3–0	(Belgium) Anderlecht
Desideri 44'; Völler 73'; Rizzitelli 76'	Report

Stadio Olimpico, Rome
Attendance: 54,024
Referee: George Courtney (England)

6 March 1991
20:30

Atalanta (Italy)	0–0	(Italy) Inter Milan
	Report

Stadio Comunale, Bergamo
Attendance: 24,000
Referee: Hubert Forstinger (Austria)

6 March 1991
17:30

Bologna (Italy)	1–1	(Portugal) Sporting CP
Türkyilmaz 49'	Report	Luizinho 88'

Stadio Renato Dall'Ara, Bologna
Attendance: 7,759
Referee: Rune Larsson (Sweden)

6 March 1991
19:00

Brøndby (Denmark)	1–0	(Soviet Union) Torpedo Moscow
Madsen 58'	Report

Brøndby Stadium, Brøndbyvester
Attendance: 15,600
Referee: Marcel Van Langenhove (Belgium)

=== Second leg ===
20 March 1991
20:00

Anderlecht (Belgium)	2–3	(Italy) Roma
Kooiman 74'; Lamptey 82'	Report	Völler 23', 55', 70'

Constant Vanden Stock Stadium, Brussels
Attendance: 23,000
Referee: Peter Mikkelsen (Denmark)

Roma won 6–2 on aggregate.

20 March 1991
20:30

Inter Milan (Italy)	2–0	(Italy) Atalanta
Serena 60'; Matthäus 63'	Report

San Siro, Milan
Attendance: 58,454
Referee: José Rosa dos Santos (Portugal)

Inter Milan won 2–0 on aggregate.

20 March 1991
22:00

Sporting CP (Portugal)	2–0	(Italy) Bologna
Cadete 20'; Gomes 80' (pen.)	Report

Estádio José Alvalade, Lisbon
Attendance: 45,000
Referee: Joël Quiniou (France)

Sporting CP won 3–1 on aggregate.

20 March 1991
17:00

Torpedo Moscow (Soviet Union)	1–0 (a.e.t.)	(Denmark) Brøndby
Shirinbekov 86'	Report
Penalties
Agashkov (penalty missed); Afanasyev (penalty scored); Grishin (penalty missed); Rogovskoy (penalty scored)	2–4	(penalty scored) Christensen; (penalty scored) Madsen; (penalty missed) Olsen; (penalty scored) Vilfort; (penalty scored) Christofte

Torpedo Stadium, Moscow
Attendance: 8,201
Referee: John Blankenstein (Netherlands)

1–1 on aggregate; Brøndby won 4–2 on penalties.

== Semi-finals ==
Team 1	Agg.	Team 2	1st leg	2nd leg
Brøndby (Denmark)	1–2	(Italy) Roma	0–0	1–2
Sporting CP (Portugal)	0–2	(Italy) Inter Milan	0–0	0–2

=== First leg ===
10 April 1991
19:00

Brøndby (Denmark)	0–0	(Italy) Roma
	Report

Brøndby Stadion, Brøndbyvester
Attendance: 17,000
Referee: Lajos Németh (Hungary)

10 April 1991
22:00

Sporting CP (Portugal)	0–0	(Italy) Inter Milan
	Report

Estádio José Alvalade, Lisbon
Attendance: 50,000
Referee: Zoran Petrović (Yugoslavia)

=== Second leg ===
24 April 1991
19:00

Roma (Italy)	2–1	(Denmark) Brøndby
Rizzitelli 33'; Völler 88'	Report	Nela 62' (o.g.)

Stadio Olimpico, Rome
Attendance: 58,042
Referee: Emilio Soriano Aladrén (Spain)

Roma won 2–1 on aggregate.

24 April 1991
20:30

Inter Milan (Italy)	2–0	(Portugal) Sporting CP
Matthäus 15' (pen.); Klinsmann 35'	Report

San Siro, Milan
Attendance: 73,134
Referee: Gérard Biguet (France)

Inter Milan won 2–0 on aggregate.

== Final ==
=== First leg ===
8 May 1991
20:30

Inter Milan (Italy)	2–0	(Italy) Roma
Matthäus 55' (pen.); Berti 67'	Report

San Siro, Milan
Attendance: 68,887
Referee: Alexey Spirin (Soviet Union)

=== Second leg ===
22 May 1991
20:30

Roma (Italy)	1–0	(Italy) Inter Milan
Rizzitelli 81'	Report

Stadio Olimpico, Rome
Attendance: 70,901
Referee: Joël Quiniou (France)

Inter Milan won 2–1 on aggregate.
