= 1989–90 Aston Villa F.C. season =

English football club season

Aston Villa
1989–90 season
- Chairman: Doug Ellis
- Manager: Graham Taylor
- Stadium: Villa Park
- First Division: 2nd
- FA Cup: Sixth round
- League Cup: Third round
- Top goalscorer: League: David Platt (21); All: David Platt (24)

The 1989–90 English football season was Aston Villa's 91st season in the Football League with Villa competing in the Football League First Division. A lowly 17th the previous season, Villa improved drastically and spent most of the season challenging for the title though finishing in second behind Liverpool. This was Villa's highest finish since 1980–81, and a great result for a team in the second season of the top flight. At the end of the season Jozef Vengloš became the first manager from outside of Britain of a top flight club in English football history.

Key players in the team this season were high-scoring midfielder David Platt, who broke into the England team and went on to play at the World Cup, as well as being voted PFA Player of the Year, and new defender Paul McGrath, a £450,000 pre-season signing from Manchester United. Aston Villa played in kit manufactured by Danish company Hummel and sponsored by Mita Copiers. There were also debuts for Kent Nielsen, Adrian Heath, Andy Comyn, Mark Blake, Tony Cascarino and Dwight Yorke.

Slovak Jozef Vengloš, who had just led Czechoslovakia to the quarter-finals of the World Cup, replaced Graham Taylor who had accepted an offer to take over management of the England national football team.

== First Division ==
Pos	Team	Pld	W	D	L	GF	GA	GD	Pts	Qualification or relegation
1	Liverpool (C)	38	23	10	5	78	37	+41	79	Disqualified from the European Cup (Note: Liverpool were banned by UEFA from its competitions from the season 1985–86 on for 10 years, because of the Heysel Stadium disaster in 1985, involving Liverpool fans. The ban was eventually lifted for the 1991–92 season.)
2	Aston Villa	38	21	7	10	57	38	+19	70	Qualification for the UEFA Cup first round
3	Tottenham Hotspur	38	19	6	13	59	47	+12	63	
4	Arsenal	38	18	8	12	54	38	+16	62	
5	Chelsea	38	16	12	10	58	50	+8	60	

Source: World Football
Rules for classification: 1) Points; 2) Goal difference; 3) Goals scored
(C) Champions

=== Matches ===
1	Nottingham Forest	1–1	Aston Villa
		Report

2	Aston Villa	1–1	Liverpool	Birmingham
		Report		Stadium: Villa Park

3	Aston Villa	1–1	Charlton Athletic	Birmingham
		Report		Stadium: Villa Park

4	Southampton	2–1	Aston Villa
		Report

5	Aston Villa	2–0	Tottenham Hotspur	Birmingham
		Report		Stadium: Villa Park

6	Sheffield Wednesday	1–0	Aston Villa
		Report

7	Aston Villa	1–3	QPR	Birmingham
				Stadium: Villa Park

8	Aston Villa	1–0	Derby County	Birmingham
				Stadium: Villa Park

9	Luton Town	0–1	Aston Villa

10	Manchester City	0–2	Aston Villa

11	Aston Villa	2–1	Crystal Palace	Birmingham
				Stadium: Villa Park

12	Aston Villa	6–2	Everton	Birmingham
				Stadium: Villa Park

13	Norwich City	2–0	Aston Villa

14	Aston Villa	4–1	Coventry City	Birmingham
				Stadium: Villa Park

15	Wimbledon	0–2	Aston Villa

16	Aston Villa	2–1	Nottingham Forest	Birmingham
				Stadium: Villa Park

17	Liverpool	1–1	Aston Villa

18	Millwall	2–0	Aston Villa

19	Aston Villa	3–0	Manchester United	Birmingham
				Stadium: Villa Park

20	Aston Villa	2–1	Arsenal	Birmingham
				Stadium: Villa Park

21	Chelsea	0–3	Aston Villa

22	Charlton Athletic	0–2	Aston Villa

23	Aston Villa	2–1	Southampton	Birmingham
				Stadium: Villa Park

24	Aston Villa	1–0	Sheffield Wednesday	Birmingham
				Stadium: Villa Park

25	Tottenham Hotspur	0–2	Aston Villa

26	Aston Villa	0–3	Wimbledon	Birmingham
				Stadium: Villa Park

27	Coventry City	2–0	Aston Villa

28	Aston Villa	2–0	Luton Town	Birmingham
				Stadium: Villa Park

29	Queens Park Rangers	1–1	Aston Villa

30	Derby County	0–1	Aston Villa

31	Crystal Palace	1–0	Aston Villa

32	Aston Villa	1–2	Manchester City	Birmingham
				Stadium: Villa Park

33	Arsenal	0–1	Aston Villa

34	Aston Villa	1–0	Chelsea	Birmingham
				Stadium: Villa Park

35	Manchester United	2–0	Aston Villa

36	Aston Villa	1–0	Millwall	Birmingham
				Stadium: Villa Park

37	Aston Villa	3–3	Norwich	Birmingham
				Stadium: Villa Park

38	Everton	3–3	Aston Villa

== FA Cup ==
Home club	Score	Away club	Round	Date
Blackburn Rovers	2–2	Aston Villa	Third round proper	6 January 1990
Aston Villa	3–1	Blackburn Rovers	Third round proper replay	10 January 1990
Aston Villa	6–0	Port Vale	Fourth round proper	27 January 1990
West Bromwich Albion	0–2	Aston Villa	Fifth round proper	17 February 1990
Oldham Athletic	3–0	Aston Villa	Sixth round proper	14 March 1990

== League Cup ==
=== Second round ===
A total of 64 teams took part in the second round, including the 28 winners from round one. The remaining Second Division clubs entered in this round, as well as the 20 sides from the First Division. Each tie was again played across two legs.

First leg

Home team	Score	Away team	Date
Aston Villa	2–1	Wolverhampton Wanderers	20 September 1989

Second leg

Home team	Score	Away team	Date	Agg
Wolverhampton Wanderers	1–1	Aston Villa	4 October 1989	2–3

=== Third round ===
Home team	Result	Away team	Date
Aston Villa	0–0	West Ham United	25 October 1989

Replay

Home team	Result	Away team	Date
West Ham United	1–0	Aston Villa	8 November 1989

== Players ==
Squad at end of season

Note: Flags indicate national team as defined under FIFA eligibility rules; some limited exceptions apply. Players may hold more than one non-FIFA nationality.

Pos.	Nation	Player
GK	ENG	Lee Butler
GK	ENG	Nigel Spink
DF	ENG	Andy Comyn
DF	ENG	Darrell Duffy
DF	ENG	Kevin Gage
DF	ENG	Bernie Gallacher
DF	ENG	Derek Mountfield
DF	ENG	Chris Price
DF	ENG	Steve Sims
DF	IRL	Paul McGrath
DF	DEN	Kent Nielsen
MF	ENG	Paul Birch

Pos.	Nation	Player
MF	ENG	Mark Blake
MF	ENG	Nigel Callaghan
MF	ENG	Gordon Cowans
MF	ENG	Tony Daley
MF	ENG	Stuart Gray (captain)
MF	ENG	David Platt
MF	ENG	Gareth Williams
FW	ENG	Ian Olney
FW	ENG	Ian Ormondroyd
FW	ENG	Dean Spink
FW	IRL	Tony Cascarino
FW	TTO	Dwight Yorke

=== Transfers ===
Left club during season Note: Flags indicate national team as defined under FIFA eligibility rules; some limited exceptions apply. Players may hold more than one non-FIFA nationality.

Pos. / Nation / Player; FW / ENG / Adrian Heath (to Manchester City)	Pos. / Nation / Player; FW / ENG / Mark Lillis (to Scunthorpe United)

In

- (Republic of Ireland) Paul McGrath – (England) Manchester United, 3 August 1989, £400,000
- (Trinidad and Tobago) Dwight Yorke - (Trinidad and Tobago) St Clair's, 19 December 1989, £120,000

Out

- (Scotland) Allan Evans – (Scotland) Leicester City, 13 July, free
- (Scotland) Alan McInally – (Germany) Bayern Munich, 11 August, £1,200,000
- (England) Mark Lillis – (England) Scunthorpe United, 21 September, £40,000
- (England) Adrian Heath – (England) Manchester City, 12 February, £300,000

== Youth and reserves ==
Note: Flags indicate national team as defined under FIFA eligibility rules; some limited exceptions apply. Players may hold more than one non-FIFA nationality.

Pos.	Nation	Player
GK	ENG	Glen Livingstone
DF	ENG	Christopher Boden
DF	ENG	John Elliott
DF	ENG	Bryan Small
DF	ENG	Andrew Smith
MF	ENG	Steve Froggatt

Pos.	Nation	Player
MF	ENG	Craig Liddle
MF	ENG	Lee Williams
FW	ENG	Martin Carruthers
FW	ENG	Tommy Mooney
FW	ENG	Mark Parrott
FW	WAL	David Jones

Trainees Note: Flags indicate national team as defined under FIFA eligibility rules; some limited exceptions apply. Players may hold more than one non-FIFA nationality.

Pos.	Nation	Player
FW	ENG	Ian Tyrrell

Apprentices Note: Flags indicate national team as defined under FIFA eligibility rules; some limited exceptions apply. Players may hold more than one non-FIFA nationality.

Pos.	Nation	Player
GK	ENG	Michael Oakes

Note: Flags indicate national team as defined under FIFA eligibility rules; some limited exceptions apply. Players may hold more than one non-FIFA nationality.

Pos.	Nation	Player
FW	ENG	Neil Floate

Other players Note: Flags indicate national team as defined under FIFA eligibility rules; some limited exceptions apply. Players may hold more than one non-FIFA nationality.

Pos.	Nation	Player
DF	ENG	Russell Bullivant
DF	ENG	David Watt
MF	ENG	Richard Crisp
MF	ENG	Brian Nicholas
FW	ENG	David Travis

Pos.	Nation	Player
FW	ENG	Stephen Walker
		Noel Callaghan
		Shepherd
	ENG	Stephen Slocombe
	SCO	Angus McKeon
		C Williams

Trialists Note: Flags indicate national team as defined under FIFA eligibility rules; some limited exceptions apply. Players may hold more than one non-FIFA nationality.

Pos.	Nation	Player
MF	TTO	Colvin Hutchinson
FW	DEN	Lars Jakobsen (on trial from OB)
