= Clot (disambiguation) =

A clot is the final product of the blood coagulation step in hemostasis.

Clot may also refer to:

- Blood Clot Boy, a figure in Native American folklore
- Clot (Barcelona Metro), a Barcelona Metro station
- El Clot-Aragó, the adjacent railway station
- Clotted cream
- In the United Kingdom, South Africa, and many other English-speaking countries, a foolish person

== People with the surname ==
- Alexandre Clot (born 1972), Swiss footballer
- André Clot (1909–2002), French historian and essayist
- Antoine Clot (1793–1868), French physician
- Auguste Clot (1858–1936), French art printer
