= Cotl =

Cotl or COTL may refer to:

- Consolers of the Lonely, 2008 studio album by American rock band the Raconteurs
- Cult of the Lamb, 2022 Australian video game
- COTL1, protein encoded by the COTL1 gene
- COTL, the East Timorese Olympic Committee in Sport in Timor-Leste

== See also ==
- Clot (disambiguation)
- Colt (disambiguation)
