= Gytis =

- Gender: Male
- Language: Lithuanian
- Name day: 1 September

Origin
- Region of origin: Lithuania

Gytis is a Lithuanian masculine given name. Notable people with the name include:

- Gytis Ivanauskas (born 1980), Lithuanian actor, dancer and choreographer
- Gytis Masiulis (born 1998), Lithuanian basketball player
- Gytis Padimanskas (born 1972), Lithuanian footballer
- Gytis Paulauskas (born 1999), Lithuanian footballer
- Gytis Sirutavičius (born 1983), Lithuanian basketball player
- Gytis Stankevičius (born 1994), Lithuanian swimmer
