= Gitselov =

Gitselov (masculine, Russian: Гицелов) or Gitselova (feminine, Russian: Гицелова) is a Russian surname. Notable people with the surname include:

- Aleksandr Gitselov (born 1963), Russian soccer player
- Pyotr Gitselov (born 1983), Russian–Swedish soccer manager and former player
