= Claudio Guerra =

Claudio Guerra may refer to:

- Claudio Guerra (footballer, born 1972), Uruguayan football midfielders
- Claudio Guerra (footballer, born 1983), Argentine football forward
