= José María Lumbreras =

Spanish footballer and coach (born 1961)

Personal information
- Full name: José María Lumbreras Paños
- Date of birth: 6 January 1961 (age 65)
- Place of birth: Tudela, Spain
- Height: 1.77 m (5 ft 10 in)
- Position: Midfielder

Youth career
- Tudelano

Senior career*
Years	Team	Apps	(Gls)
1978	Tudelano	5	(1)
1978–1979	Osasuna B		
1979–1987	Osasuna	260	(16)
1987–1989	Zaragoza	62	(2)
1989–1996	Real Sociedad	138	(3)
Total		465	(22)

International career
1980	Spain U20	1	(0)
1980–1982	Spain U21	13	(0)
1982–1987	Spain U23	3	(0)

Managerial career
- 1998–2002: Tudelano
- 2008–2013: Tudelano
- 2013–2014: Real Sociedad (assistant)
- 2018–2020: Tudelano
- * Club domestic league appearances and goals

José María "Txema" Lumbreras Paños (born 6 January 1961) is a Spanish former professional football midfielder and manager.

He played 423 La Liga matches over 16 seasons, representing in the competition Osasuna, Zaragoza and Real Sociedad. All clubs combined, he scored 19 goals.

Lumbreras started working as a coach in 1998, going on to be in charge of Tudelano for several years.

== Playing career ==
Born in Tudela, Navarre, Lumbreras signed with CA Osasuna from CD Tudelano at the age of 17. He became first choice for the first team of the former club only one year later, scoring two goals in 36 matches during the season as it returned to La Liga after 17 years following a third-place finish in the Segunda División.

From 1980 until his retirement, Lumbreras only competed in the top tier. His first appearance in the competition took place on 7 September 1980, when he played the full 90 minutes in a 1–0 home win against UD Las Palmas.

Lumbreras scored a career-best four goals in the 1981–82 campaign, helping his team to the tenth position. In the summer of 1987 he joined Real Zaragoza, finding the net in his league debut to help the hosts defeat Real Sociedad (1–0) but also putting one past his own net in a 1–7 home loss to Real Madrid two rounds later.

Lumbreras retired as a footballer at the end of 1995–96 at the age of 35, after seven seasons at San Sebastián-based Real Sociedad and 157 competitive games. He scored twice in the UEFA Cup with his last club, in a 3–2 defeat at FC Lausanne-Sport in 1990 and a 2–0 home victory over Vitória S.C. of Portugal two years later.

== Coaching career ==
On 2 May 2008, late into the campaign in the Tercera División, Lumbreras replaced David Conget as manager of Tudelano. In 2012, after two fruitless first places in the regular season, promotion to Segunda División B was achieved; he led the team to survival the following year, as well as qualification to the Copa del Rey.

On 10 June 2013, both Lumbreras and Bittor Alkiza were named assistants to newly appointed Jagoba Arrasate at Real Sociedad. He returned to his previous club in early November 2018, after the dismissal of Iñigo Valencia.

== Personal life ==
Lumbreras' son, Fernando (born 1984), was also a footballer. A defender, he was developed at Real Sociedad and was also coached by his father at Tudelano.

In 2011, Lumbreras was voted People's Person in his hometown.

== See also ==
- List of La Liga players (400+ appearances)
