= Björn Arens =

German footballer

Personal information
- Date of birth: 29 September 1972 (age 54)
- Height: 1.82 m (6 ft 0 in)
- Position: Defender

Senior career*
Years	Team	Apps	(Gls)
1991–1992	Wuppertaler SV		
1992–1995	1. FC Köln II		
1995–2000	Rot-Weiß Oberhausen		
2000–2003	VfB Lübeck		
- * Club domestic league appearances and goals

Björn Arens (born 29 September 1972) is a retired German football defender.
