= Blood Clot Boy =

Figure in Native American folklore

Blood Clot Boy is a figure in the mythologies of several Native American tribes, including the Blackfoot, Arapaho, Santee, and Lakota. He is typically depicted as being born after a clot of blood from a buffalo was placed in a pot of boiling water, although the manner in which Blood Clot Boy is given life can vary between versions of the story.

Native Americans passed down a majority of their tales through oral tradition rather than writing them down, resulting in many variations of the same story with some retellings being drastically different from one another. Despite this, there is the presence of recurring characters and themes from story to story with varying degrees of similarity and significance to the myth between each iteration.

== Story ==
=== Blackfoot version ===
A young man comes to the camp of an old man with a wife and three daughters. The young man proved to be a decent person and good hunter, so the old man gives him his daughters as wives so that he may stay around to help them hunt. However, the young man began to grow more and more greedy with what he gathered, no longer sharing any meat with the old man and his wife. The two older daughters did not give them anything to eat either as the young man had told them not to, although the youngest daughter would provide them with food whenever an opportunity arose so they would not starve.

When the old man and his son-in-law went hunting one day, a large clot of blood fell from one of the buffalo that they had shot. Hiding the blood clot in his quiver, the old man brought it home to his wife so that they could cook it. After the blood clot was dropped into the boiling water of a pot, the two heard crying as a baby boy had taken the place of the blood clot, deciding to name him Kutoyis. The parents worried that if their son-in-law found out Kutoyis was a boy then he would kill him. When the son-in-law heard Kutoyis’ crying and told his wives to find out whether Kutoyis was a boy or a girl, the parents convinced their daughters that the baby was a girl.

After a few days, Kutoyis had grown into a young man. When questioning his parents' lack of food, his father explained to him the abuse they had received from their son-in-law and so Kutoyis compelled his father to go with him to hunt very early in the morning. Once the son-in-law woke up, he questioned the old man's wife as to where her husband was. When she told him he had gone out hunting, he became enraged and threatened to harm her before going off to seek the old man. Upon seeing the son-in-law coming, Kutoyis hid behind a buffalo he had hunted as the son-in-law arrived and threaten kill the old man with his bow. Kutoyis spoke to the old man from behind the buffalo, encouraging him to shoot his arrows back at the son-in-law. The two exchanged shots, each shot missing one another. When the old man became afraid, Kutoyis revealed himself to the son-in-law and questioned the abuse of his father before killing him with his bow and arrow. Kutoyis then asked his father to bring his daughters to him, punishing the two older ones for neglecting their parents but giving the youngest a lighter punishment because, although she loved the son-in-law, she had also provided food to her parents when the others would not.

=== Arapaho version ===
There was an old man who lived with his wife in a tipi, his daughter and son-in-law in another tipi next to theirs. The son-in-law would never share the meat from his hunts with the old man, who was unable to successfully hunt buffalo and went hungry. One day while hunting, the old man shot a buffalo in its chest, but it did not die and ran way. Fortunately, the buffalo had bled out a clot of blood which the old man took home so that his wife could cook it into soup. Upon dropping it into a pot of warm water, a crying baby boy emerged from the blood clot.

The son-in-law had heard the crying from the baby, asking his wife to tell him if it was a boy or a girl. The parents told their daughter to tell her husband that the baby was a girl, for they were fearful that the son-in-law would kill the baby if he knew he was a boy. After the daughter tells him the baby is a girl, the son-in-law begins to treat the parents well and provides them with meat. The baby quickly grew into a young boy, not allowed to leave the tipi so that the son-in-law does not learn that he is a boy. Eventually the parents are unable to keep him in the tent any longer and the boy goes outside to shoot with his bow and arrow. When the son-in-law discovers that the child was a boy, he becomes very upset that he had been lied to. The son-in-law demands that he take the boy to go hunting with him, the parents afraid that he will surely kill him but are unable to do anything to stop him. The boy insists on going with the son-in-law, assuring that he will come back to his parents.

The parents watch as the boy goes off with the son-in-law, remaining outside until sundown when the boy returns alone with buffalo meat. When they ask where the son-in-law was, the boy said that he had killed him. The boy then tells the story of what had happened, describing how the son-in-law had killed a buffalo but threatened to kill the boy when he tried to take a piece of meat for his parents. When the boy refused, the son-in-law transformed into a bear who mocked the boy for standing up to him. As the bear charged at the boy, he shot at the bear twice with his bow and killed him. For their son's bravery, the parents and sister decided to give the boy a special name, deciding on naming him Blood Clot Boy.

=== Santee version ===
A Badger is visited by a Gray Bear that asks if his family may come and live with the Badger, who agrees because he has a great amount of buffalo meat. When the Gray Bear returns with his family the next day, they take possession of the entirety of the Badger's meat and drive him and his family to live outside. The Gray Bear forces the Badger to hunt buffalo for him every day, not allowing him to keep any of the meat. However, Gray Bear's youngest child tosses over a buffalo leg to the Badger's family every morning which prevents them from starving.

One day, the Badger tries to carry home meat for his family after a hunt and refuses to dress the rest of the buffalo for the Gray Bear. In response, the Gray Bear pushes him into a pool of buffalo blood from which the Badger takes a clot of blood before fleeing. The Badger returns home and constructs a sweat lodge, performing a purification ceremony on the clot of blood which transforms it into a young man who the Badger names Blood Clot Boy.

The next morning after hunting buffalo with Gray Bear, the Badger tries to bring home meat for his family and is once again thrown down into the buffalo blood by Gray Bear. Blood Clot Boy witnesses this and questions the mistreatment of his father, slaying Gray Bear by shooting him in the little finger with an arrow. Blood Clot Boy then returns home and slays the rest of Gray Bear's family except for his youngest child, who the Badger told him to spare because he kept their family alive by providing them buffalo legs.

Eventually, Blood Clot Boy wishes to go on a journey to visit others who live nearby and his father gives him permission, but warns Blood Clot Boy that he will encounter an old man who will try to deceive him and he must not listen to him. Once Blood Clot Boy began on his journey, he ran into an old man who asks him to hunt a grouse which he refuses to do. Later on, he runs into the same old man again who now offers to smoke with him and Blood Clot Boy agrees this time. After Blood Clot Boy fell asleep, the old man reveals himself to be the trickster Iktomi who transforms him into an ugly dog. Iktomi then steals Blood Clot Boy's clothes, transforming into him so that he may impersonate Blood Clot Boy who was famous among those who lived nearby.

=== Lakota version ===
A rabbit is kicked out of his home by a bear, who slays all the buffalo in the region and does not share the meat with the rabbit. This causes the rabbit to nearly starve. When the rabbit finds the blood clot, he creates a sweat bath over the clot of blood, and after heating the water, the boy emerges from the sweat bath, red from the heat. He then proceeds to scourge the bear and his family for his selfishness, sparing the youngest, who shared small amounts of meat with the rabbit.

In a different version of the story, a man returns to his tribe from the woods with an elk from his hunt, taking a clot of blood from it and placing it down. Speaking to the blood clot, the man asks it to grow into a boy because he had recently lost his only son. After moving the blood clot onto a piece of leather, a baby boy formed from it that quickly grew into a young man who was gifted with great skill in archery.

Blood Clot Boy is approached by Iktomi who tells him of the chief's beautiful daughter. After going to visit her, the chief tells him that he must shoot a fox and a hawk from within his tipi if he wishes to marry his daughter. Before doing so, Blood Clot Boy goes to the woods to hunt and is accompanied by Iktomi who tricks Blood Clot Boy into getting his arm stuck in a tree. Iktomi laughs at Blood Clot Boy before transforming into him, returning to the chief to take on his challenge so that he may marry his daughter instead. When a fox and later an eagle pass by, Iktomi attempts to shoot at each of them but misses his arrows.

Eventually, Blood Clot Boy manages to free himself and returns to the tipi to warn the chief of Iktomi's deception, resulting in the tribe chasing after Iktomi to kill him. However, Iktomi lies to the tribe that it is Blood Clot Boy who is the trickster, causing them to turn on Blood Clot Boy as they hang him. When the tribe tries to cut him up, Blood Clot Boy's wounds continuously heal which makes them realize that he is the real Blood Clot Boy. The tribe then chases Iktomi yet again and catches him, hanging the trickster so that they may cut him to pieces, but are unable to kill Iktomi for he is immortal.

== Symbolism ==
Blood Clot Boy's origin of buffalo blood suggests that he was viewed as a hero that represented generosity, due to the Lakota's belief that the buffalo were the greatest symbol of generosity because of their sacrifice to men. They supplied food, clothes, and ceremonial objects to the Lakota, at the ultimate price of their life. Furthermore, Blood Clot Boy is recognized as a hero by others within numerous renditions of the story through his actions against the story's antagonist allowing the buffalo population to flourish.

Appearing in several iterations of the story, Iktomi appears as a counter to Blood Clot Boy in which he deceives the hero. He acts as a trickster who impedes or entirely stops Blood Clot Boy's journey and impersonates him, a recurring theme which is also present in other Native American myths of traditional heroes as Iktomi acts as an obstacle to their respective protagonists.

Certain versions of the story of Blood Clot Boy suggest that the aggressor is symbolic for the encroachment of European settlers upon Native American lands as the aggressor claims the food and shelter of Blood Clot Boy's family with nothing in return. In a similar manner to how the ceremony of the sweat lodge is how Blood Clot Boy is given life for the purpose of defeating the aggressor, the story conveys that the process of ceremony and tradition is a way for Native Americans to maintain their courage and identity amidst displacement.

== Recurring characters ==
=== Blood Clot Boy ===
The titular protagonist, Blood Clot Boy is given life by his father from a blood clot either through accidental or intentional means. Blood Clot Boy takes on the role of a hero in his myth as he defends his father from any further abuse at the hands of the aggressor, slaying them and returning prosperity to his family. Blood Clot Boy is also shown to be a just individual who delivers retribution on those who have displayed cruelty while granting mercy to individuals who have shown generosity such as Gray Bear's youngest child. Despite his sensible judgement, Blood Clot Boy is not infallible as he is susceptible to the trickery of Iktomi.

=== Blood Clot Boy's father ===
As the one who discovers the blood clot in most retellings of the myth, Blood Clot Boy's father is the one responsible for the birth of Blood Clot Boy. The father is usually depicted as an elderly man, although in certain versions instead depict him as an animal such as a badger or rabbit. He is the primary victim of the aggressor's abuse as they force the father to help them with hunting, but deny him any food he helps gather.

=== Aggressor figure ===
The aggressor of the Blood Clot Boy myth is a greedy individual who mistreats the father and denies him any food, typically portrayed as a bear or as the son-in-law of Blood Clot Boy's father. He is also shown to be envious in some retellings as the aggressor was willing to kill an infant Blood Clot Boy for being a male, resulting in the father having to lie about his son being female to protect him from the aggressor's wrath. He is slain by Blood Clot Boy at the climax of the story, allowing the father and his family to continue to prosper without fear of the aggressor.

=== Generous figure ===
Examples of some of the roles that this figure takes on are that of the sister of Blood Clot Boy or the youngest child of the aggressor. In some accounts of the myth, they are shown to be generous as they share their food with Blood Clot Boy's parents unbeknownst to the aggressor, saving them from starvation. The figure also lies on behalf of Blood Clot Boy's parents to the aggressor regarding Blood Clot Boy's gender when he is an infant, sparing him from being killed by the aggressor for being male. Their good will is recognized by Blood Clot Boy at the story's resolution in which he spares them from the same punishment that he gave to the aggressor and his family for their cruelty.

=== Iktomi ===
A trickster spirit from Lakota mythology, Iktomi appears after the resolution with the aggressor figure in some renditions of the myth. Iktomi takes pleasure in deceiving Blood Clot Boy, often mocking him after playing tricks on the hero. He also takes on the appearance of Blood Clot Boy after tricking him so that he may take the glory of Blood Clot Boy's fame for himself, although it is unclear whether Iktomi does this because he enjoys the fame and attention or simply takes pleasure in deceiving others into believing he is Blood Clot Boy.
