= Jacob Eli Olsen =

Faroese footballer (born 1972)

Personal information
- Full name: Jacob Eli Sjønhard Olsen
- Date of birth: 2 October 1972 (age 54)
- Place of birth: Tórshavn, Faroe Islands
- Height: 1.76 m (5 ft 9 in)
- Position: Defender

Senior career*
Years	Team	Apps	(Gls)
1989–1998	B68 Toftir	104	(1)
1993–1996	B68 Toftir II	3	(1)
1999	HB	12	(0)
1999	HB II	1	(0)
2000–2005	B68 Toftir	52	(1)
2002	B68 Toftir II	1	(0)
2006	LÍF	7	(0)
2007	FS Vágar	17	(0)
Total		197	(3)

International career
1992	Faroe Islands U21	1	(0)
1991	Faroe Islands (unofficial)	1	(0)
1992–1997	Faroe Islands	2	(0)

Managerial career
- 2007: FS Vágar (assistant)
- * Club domestic league appearances and goals

Jacob Eli Sjønhard Olsen (born 2 October 1972) is a Faroese former footballer who played as a defender and made two appearances for the Faroe Islands national team.

== Career ==
Olsen made his international debut for the Faroe Islands on 5 August 1992 in a friendly match against Israel, which finished as a 1–1 draw in Toftir. He earned his second and final cap on 27 July 1997 in a friendly against Iceland, which finished as a 0–1 loss in Höfn.

== Career statistics ==
=== International ===
Faroe Islands
Year	Apps	Goals
1992	1	0
1997	1	0
Total	2	0
