= Artur Belotserkovets =

Russian footballer

Personal information
- Full name: Artur Vladimirovich Belotserkovets
- Date of birth: 29 January 1972 (age 54)
- Place of birth: Leningrad, Russian SFSR
- Height: 1.80 m (5 ft 11 in)
- Position: Defender

Youth career
- ShISP-62 Leningrad
- FC Kirovets-Nadezhda Leningrad

Senior career*
Years	Team	Apps	(Gls)
1989	FC Kirovets Leningrad	2	(0)
1990	FC Dynamo Leningrad	9	(1)
1991–1998	FC Zenit St. Petersburg	191	(0)
1998–1999	FC Arsenal Tula	26	(0)
2000	FC Metallurg Lipetsk	10	(0)
2001–2002	FC Dynamo-SPb St. Petersburg	45	(0)
2002	FC Zhenis	5	(0)
2003	FC Titan Moscow	20	(0)

International career
1993	Russia U-21	3	(0)
- * Club domestic league appearances and goals

Artur Vladimirovich Belotserkovets (Russian: Артур Владимирович Белоцерковец; born 29 January 1972) is a Russian former professional footballer.

== Club career ==
He made his professional debut in the Soviet Second League in 1989 for FC Kirovets Leningrad.
