= Hajnalka Sipos =

Hungarian footballer

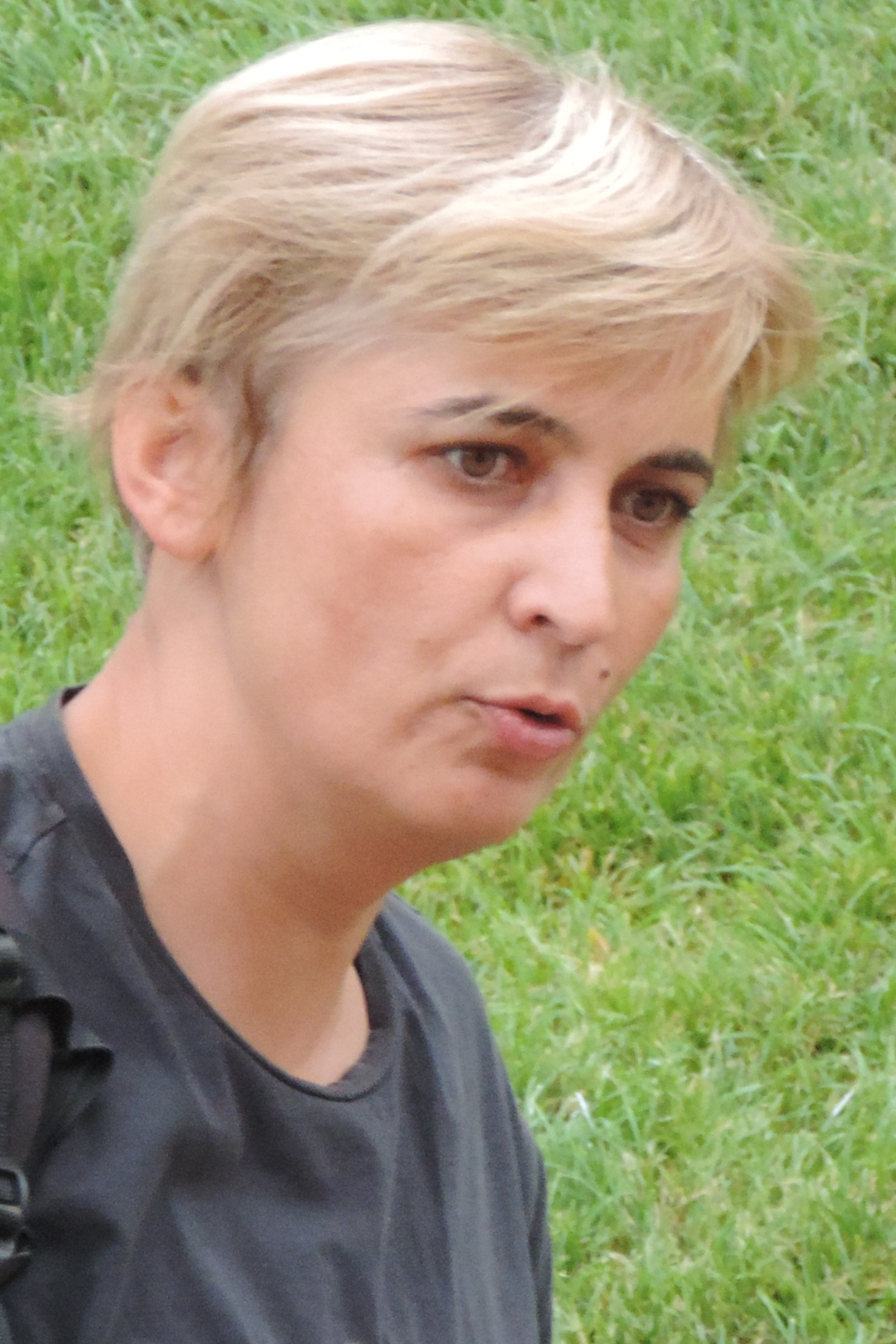
- Sipos in 2013

Personal information
- Full name: Hajnalka Sipos
- Date of birth: 11 October 1972 (age 54)
- Place of birth: Hungary
- Position: Goalkeeper

Senior career*
Years	Team	Apps	(Gls)
–2002	Renova		
2002–2005	László Kórház		
2005–2007	MTK		
2007–2008	Gÿori ETO		
2008–2009	MTK		
2009	Union Nové Zámky		
2009–	Osijek		

International career^{‡}
2004–2006	Hungary	7	(0)
- * Club domestic league appearances and goals ‡ National team caps and goals as of 7 March 2006

Hajnalka Sipos is a Hungarian football goalkeeper currently playing for ŽNK Osijek in the Croatian 1st Division. She has played the Champions League with MTK Hungária FC and Osijek.

She has been a member of the Hungarian national team.
