= Brian Flood =

Irish footballer

Brian Flood (born 22 June 1971) is an Irish former footballer who played as a defender and midfielder for Shelbourne in the League of Ireland.

== Career ==
Flood made his League of Ireland debut for Shelbourne on 3 September 1989 and scored the goal that wrapped up Shels first league title for thirty years when the title was secured in Dundalk in 1992.

In the 1996 FAI Cup Final against St. Patrick's Athletic he took over as goalkeeper after Alan Gough was sent off after just twenty minutes. At the time only three subs were allowed and manager Damien Richardson chose not to put a goalkeeper on the bench. Flood performed heroically and helped Shels secure a 1–1 draw and returned to his usual outfield role for the replay which Shels won 2–1.
