= COTL1 =

Protein-coding gene in humans

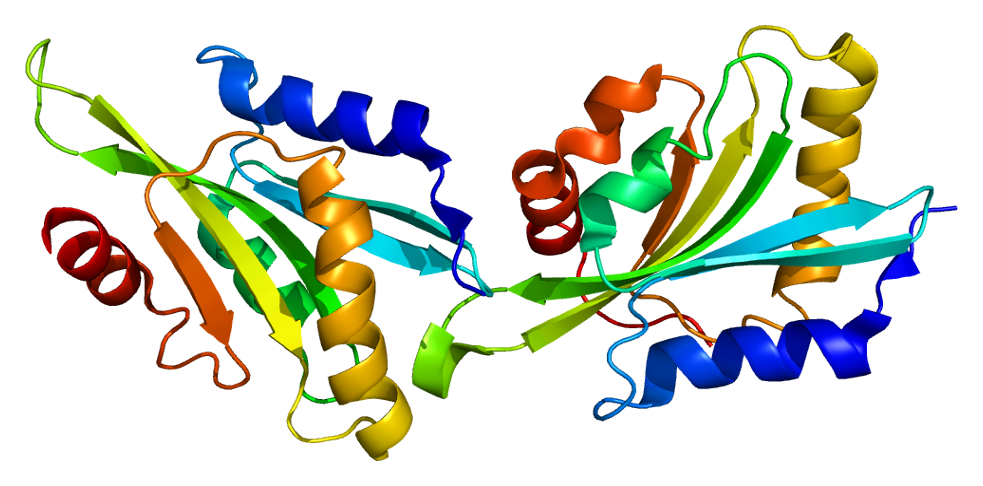
Available structures
PDB	Ortholog search: PDBe RCSB
PDB	List of PDB id codes 1T2L, 1T3X, 1T3Y, 1TMW, 1VFQ, 1WNJ

Identifiers
- Aliases: COTL1, CLP, coactosin like F-actin binding protein 1
- External IDs: OMIM: 606748; MGI: 1919292; HomoloGene: 10898; GeneCards: COTL1; OMA:COTL1 - orthologs

Gene location (Human)
Chr.	Chromosome 16 (human)
Band	16q24.1	Start	84,565,596 bp
Band	16q24.1	End	84,618,078 bp

Gene location (Mouse)
Chr.	Chromosome 8 (mouse)
Band	8|8 E1	Start	120,535,961 bp
Band	8|8 E1	End	120,567,283 bp
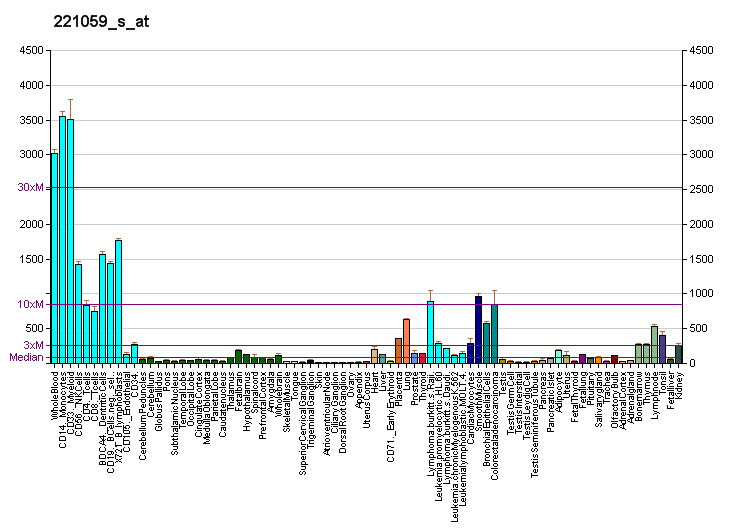

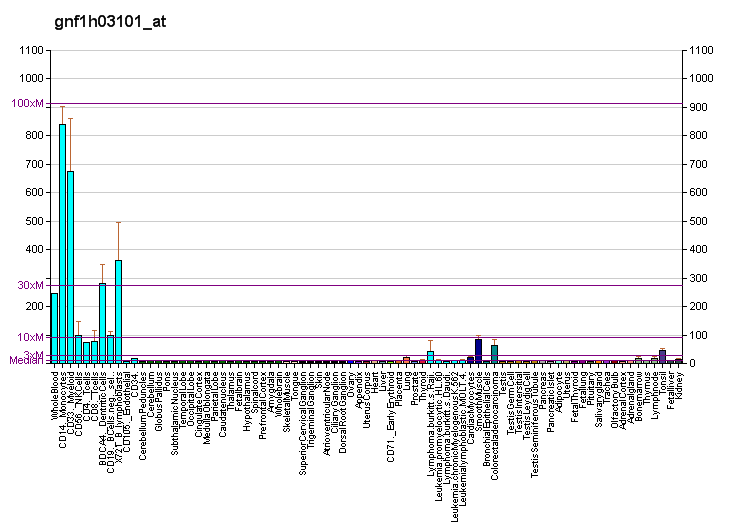
RNA expression pattern
Bgee	Human / Mouse (ortholog); Top expressed in: monocyte; granulocyte; blood; spleen; appendix; lymph node; retinal pigment epithelium; ganglionic eminence; bone marrow; gallbladder / Top expressed in: granulocyte; mesenteric lymph nodes; epithelium of stomach; migratory enteric neural crest cell; epithelium of lens; motor neuron; yolk sac; mucous cell of stomach; fossa; conjunctival fornix; More reference expression data
BioGPS	More reference expression data
Gene ontology
Molecular function	enzyme binding; protein binding; actin binding
Cellular component	cytoplasm; extracellular exosome; cytoskeleton; intracellular anatomical structure; nucleus; extracellular region; secretory granule lumen; ficolin-1-rich granule lumen
Biological process	defense response to fungus; neutrophil degranulation; biological process
Sources:Amigo / QuickGO
Orthologs
Species	Human	Mouse
Entrez	23406	72042
Ensembl	ENSG00000103187	ENSMUSG00000031827
UniProt	Q14019	Q9CQI6
RefSeq (mRNA)	NM_021149	NM_028071
RefSeq (protein)	NP_066972	NP_082347
Location (UCSC)	Chr 16: 84.57 – 84.62 Mb	Chr 8: 120.54 – 120.57 Mb
PubMed search
- Wikidata
View/Edit Human	View/Edit Mouse

Coactosin-like protein (COTL1 or CLP) is a protein that in humans is encoded by the COTL1 gene.

== Function ==
This gene encodes one of the numerous actin-binding proteins which regulate the actin cytoskeleton. This protein binds F-actin, and also interacts with and thereby stabilizes 5-lipoxygenase (ALOX5). Although this gene has been reported to map to chromosome 17 in the Smith-Magenis syndrome region, the best alignments for this gene are to chromosome 16. The Smith-Magenis syndrome region is the site of two related pseudogenes.

== Interactions ==
COTL1 has been shown to interact with ALOX5. ALOX5 is the first committed enzyme in the metabolism of arachidonic acid to an array of biologically important cell signaling agents: a) the pro-inflammatory mediator, leukotriene B4 (LTB4); b) the airways constrictors, LTC4, LTD4, and LTE4; c) the 5-hydroxyeicosatetraenoic acid family of pro-inflammatory and pro-allergic reactions mediators, 5-HETE and 5-oxo-eicosatetraenoic acid. ALOX5 also contributes to the metabolism of arachidonic acid and other polyunsaturated fatty acids to agents which act block inflammation and allergic reactions, the specialized pro-resolving mediators of the lipoxin and resolvin subclasses. Based on in vitro studies, COTL1 serves to stabilize ALOX5, acting as a chaperone or scaffold, to avert the enzyme's inactivation and thereby to promote its metabolic activity.
