= Antonis Papadimitriou =

Greek footballer

Personal information
- Full name: Antonios Papadimitriou
- Date of birth: 17 March 1972 (age 54)
- Position: Goalkeeper

Senior career*
Years	Team	Apps	(Gls)
–2000	Pierikos		
2000–2001	Panionios		
2001–?	PAS Giannina		
2003–2004?	Poseidon Neon Poron		
- Pierikos
- * Club domestic league appearances and goals

Antonis Papadimitriou (Greek: Αντώνης Παπαδημητρίου; born 17 March 1972) is a retired Greek football goalkeeper.
