= Lars Jakobsen =

Danish footballer (born 1961)

Lars Jakobsen (born 4 November 1961) is a Danish former football (soccer) player, who played for Odense Boldklub. He played four games and scored one goal for the Denmark national football team.
