= André Clot =

French historian and essayist

- Born: 9 November 1909; Grenoble
- Died: 15 November 2002 (aged 93)
- Occupations: Historian, essayist

André Clot (9 November 1909 – 15 November 2002) was a French historian and essayist.

Clot worked from 1936 to 1942 for the news agency agence Havas, from 1943 to 1945 for Radio-Brazzaville and finally from 1945 up to his superannuation for the Agence France-Presse (AFP).

He lived for many years in Turkey and the countries of the Near and Middle East and was expert on Islam.

He published books about the history and culture of Islamic countries.

== Works ==
- L'Espagne musulmane. VIIIe–XVe siècle. Éditions Perrin, Paris 1999, ISBN 2-262-01425-6.
- L'Egypte des Mamelouks : L'empire des esclaves 1250-1517, Perrin, Paris 1999, ISBN 2-262-01030-7.
- Les Grands Moghols, 1993. Plon, Paris 1993, ISBN 2-259-02698-2.
- Mehmed II, le conquérant de Byzance (1432-1481), Perrin, Paris 1990, ISBN 2-262-00719-5.
- Haroun al-Rachid et le temps des "Mille et une nuits". Fayard, Paris 1986, ISBN 2-213-01810-3. (English version: Harun al-Rashid and the World of The Thousand and One Nights; Translated by John Howe, Saqi Books, New York 2005, ISBN 0-86356-550-6)
- Soliman le Magnifique, Fayard, Paris 1983, ISBN 2-213-01260-1. (English version: Suleiman the Magnificent: The Man, His Life, His Epoch. Translated by Matthew J. Reisz, Saqi Books, New York 1992, ISBN 0-86356-126-8).
