= Mikael Göransson =

Swedish footballer

Personal information
- Date of birth: 15 May 1966 (age 60)
- Height: 1.82 m (6 ft 0 in)
- Position: Midfielder

Senior career*
Years	Team	Apps	(Gls)
1984–1986	Skogens IF		
1987–1991	GAIS		
1992–1998	Västra Frölunda IF		
1999	Vaasan PS		
1999–2000	IF Elfsborg		
2001–2006	BK Häcken		
- * Club domestic league appearances and goals

Mikael Göransson (born 15 May 1966) is a Swedish retired football midfielder.
