= Craig Goodwin (Welsh footballer) =

Welsh footballer

Personal information
- Full name: Craig Goodwin
- Date of birth: 12 February 1974 (age 52)
- Place of birth: Wrexham, Wales
- Position: Full back

Senior career*
Years	Team	Apps	(Gls)
1992–1993	Chester City	5	(0)
- * Club domestic league appearances and goals

Craig Goodwin (born 12 February 1974) is a Welsh footballer, who played as a full back in the Football League for Chester City.
