= Aleksei Morochko =

Russian footballer

Personal information
- Full name: Aleksei Valeryevich Morochko
- Date of birth: 16 December 1972 (age 53)
- Height: 1.84 m (6 ft 1/2 in)
- Position: Defender

Senior career*
Years	Team	Apps	(Gls)
1989	SC Tavriya Simferopol	1	(0)
1992	FC Surozh Sudak		
1993–1994	FC Sirius Zhovti Vody		
1994–1995	FC Gekris Anapa	57	(0)
1996–1997	FC Chernomorets Novorossiysk	13	(0)
1997–1998	FC Dynamo Stavropol	42	(0)
1999	FC Arsenal Tula	28	(0)
2000	FC Shinnik Yaroslavl	10	(0)
2001–2004	FC Metallurg Lipetsk	147	(0)
2005–2006	FC Sodovik Sterlitamak	45	(0)
2006	FC Metallurg Lipetsk	8	(0)
2011	FC Gigant Sotnikovskoye		
2012	FC Signal-KTG Izobilny		
- * Club domestic league appearances and goals

Aleksei Valeryevich Morochko (Russian: Алексей Валерьевич Морочко; born 16 December 1972) is a former Russian football player.
