= Michael Binder =

Austrian footballer

Personal information
- Date of birth: 14 May 1969 (age 57)
- Place of birth: Mödling
- Positions: Forward; midfielder (Note: Binder played a forward earlier in his career, and as a midfielder later in his career.)

Senior career*
Years	Team	Apps	(Gls)
1985–1989	FC Admira/Wacker		
1989–1990	SK VÖEST Linz		
1990–1991	FC Admira/Wacker		
1991–1992	Kremser SC		
1992–1993	Austria Wien		
1993–2000	VfB Admira Wacker Mödling		
2000–2001	SV Würmla		
2001–2003	Floridsdorfer AC		
2003–2004	Wiener Sport-Club		
2004–2008	FC Stadlau		
2009	KSV Ankerbrot		
- * Club domestic league appearances and goals

Michael Binder (born 14 May 1969) is a retired Austrian football midfielder.

== Personal life ==
Binder's son, Nicolas Binder, followed in his footsteps and is a professional footballer in Austria.
