= Andrei Nemykin =

Russian footballer (1972–2026)

Personal information
- Full name: Andrei Alekseyevich Nemykin
- Date of birth: 20 February 1972
- Date of death: 28 October 2026 (aged 54)
- Height: 1.85 m (6 ft 1 in)
- Position: Goalkeeper

Senior career*
Years	Team	Apps	(Gls)
1991	Torpedo Armavir	34	(0)
1992	Kuban Krasnodar	2	(0)
1992	Niva Slavyansk-na-Kubani	9	(0)
1993–1994	Kuban Krasnodar	13	(0)
1994–1995	Niva Slavyansk-na-Kubani	24	(0)
1995	Kuban Krasnodar	2	(0)
1996	Niva Slavyansk-na-Kubani	10	(0)
2000	FC Kolos Pavlovskaya		
2000–2002	FC GNS-Spartak Krasnodar		
2004	FC GNS-Spartak Krasnodar		
2006–2007	FC GNS-Spartak Krasnodar		
- * Club domestic league appearances and goals

Andrei Alekseyevich Nemykin (Russian: Андрей Алексеевич Немыкин; 20 February 1972 – 28 October 2026) was a Russian footballer who played as a goalkeeper. He died on 28 October 2026, at the age of 54.
