= Nieuw Monnikenhuize =

Multi-use stadium in Arnhem, Netherlands

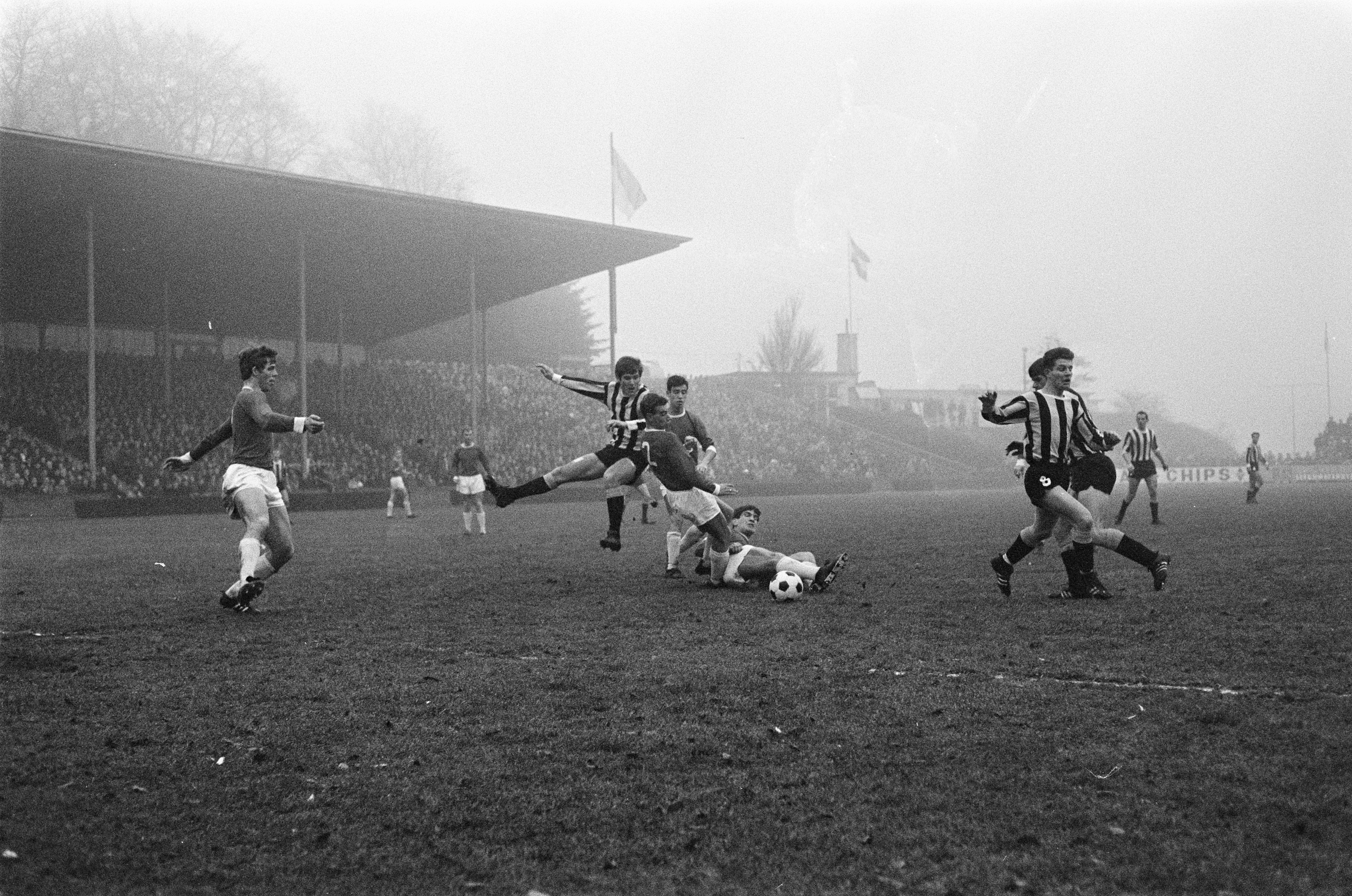
Vitesse Arnhem (striped shirts) vs. Alkmaar Zaanstreek at the Nieuw Monnikenhuize, 1967

The Nieuw Monnikenhuize [niu̯ ˈmɔ.nɪk.ən.ˌɦœy̯.zə] was a multi-use stadium situated in Monnikenhuize, a northern neighbourhood of Arnhem, Netherlands; it replaced the previous Monnikenhuize (1915–1950). It was used mostly for football matches and hosted the home matches of SBV Vitesse Arnhem. The stadium was able to hold 12,000 people in a mix of seats and standing, however with the addition of temporary bleachers it could be raised to 18,000.

The stadium was opened on 3 September 1950. The first match saw Vitesse beat Feyenoord 2–1.

The last game was played on 21 December 1997, Vitesse beating FC Twente 2–1. The last goal in the stadium was scored by Vitesse player Dejan Čurović.

It closed in 1998 when Vitesse moved into the GelreDome. The site was redeveloped for housing.
