= Zdzisław Strojek =

Polish footballer

Personal information
- Date of birth: 6 December 1964 (age 61)
- Place of birth: Dębica, Poland
- Height: 1.75 m (5 ft 9 in)
- Position: Forward

Youth career
- LKS Góra Motyczna

Senior career*
Years	Team	Apps	(Gls)
1985–1986	Igloopol Dębica		
1987–1989	Wisła Kraków		
1989	Igloopol Dębica		
1989–1996	GKS Katowice	194	(18)
1997	VfB Mödling		
1997–1999	Hutnik Kraków		
1999–2001	Lubań Maniowy		
2001–2002	Kmita Zabierzów		
2002–2004	Lotnik Kryspinów		
- * Club domestic league appearances and goals

Zdzisław Strojek (born 6 December 1964) is a Polish former professional footballer who played as a forward.

== Honours ==
GKS Katowice

- Polish Cup: 1990–91, 1992–93
- Polish Super Cup: 1991, 1995
