= Richard Sosa =

Uruguayan footballer

Personal information
- Full name: Richard Fabián Sosa Zapata
- Date of birth: 5 January 1972
- Place of birth: Montevideo, Uruguay
- Height: 1.81 m (5 ft 11 in)
- Position: Midfielder

Senior career*
Years	Team	Apps	(Gls)
1995–2000	Villa Española		
2001	Deportes Puerto Montt	2	(0)
- * Club domestic league appearances and goals

Richard Fabián Sosa Zapata (born January 5, 1972, in Montevideo) is a Uruguayan former footballer who played as a midfielder for Villa Española and for Chilean club Puerto Montt.

== Career ==
Sosa played for Villa Española from 1995 to 2000. He helped them gain promotion from the Uruguayan Segunda División via the play-offs in 1999, and scored once in the 2000 Primera División Apertura, in a 2–1 defeat against Tacuarembó, before the club were excluded from the Clausura and administratively relegated. He moved on to Chilean Primera División club Puerto Montt for the 2001 season.
