= Jens Christian Madsen =

Danish footballer (born 1970)

Jens Madsen
Personal information
- Full name: Jens Christian Madsen
- Date of birth: 1 February 1970 (age 56)
- Place of birth: Køge, Denmark
- Position: Midfielder

Senior career*
Years	Team	Apps	(Gls)
1987–1988	Køge Boldklub	?	(?)
1988–1994	Brøndby	128	(16)
1994–1997	AaB	113	(26)
1997–2000	Herfølge	93	(13)
2000	Skoda Xanthi	2	(0)
2000–2001	Livingston	0	(0)
2001–2002	Herfølge	1	(0)

International career
- Denmark
- * Club domestic league appearances and goals

Jens Christian Madsen (born 1 February 1970), also known as is a Danish former footballer who played as a midfielder. He competed in the men's tournament at the 1992 Summer Olympics.

== Career ==
Madsen started his career with Køge Boldklub but soon moved to Brøndby IF, where he went on to make 186 appearances for the club in which he scored 21 goals between 1988 and 1994. He also won three Danish championships at the club as well as two Danish Cups. Madsen moved to AaB in 1994, where he won another championship in his first year. Later, he moved to Herfølge Boldklub, where he won his fifth championship in 2000 with his third club as an active player.

After a hugely successful playing career in Denmark, he moved abroad for the first time in 2000, signing with Greek Super League club Skoda Xanthi. He left after five months, describing his tenure there as "a personal crisis", and added in an interview with Tipsbladet: "The club had no idea who I was. I might as well have been a handball player". Madsen later signed with Scottish club Livingston, but said that he had suffered personally from his experience in Greece, which meant that he lacked motivation.

Madsen retired from football after one season in Herfølge Boldklub in 2002.

== Honours ==
Brøndby

- 1st Division^{(I)}: 1988, 1990, 1991
- Danish Cup: 1988–89, 1993–94

AaB

- Danish Superliga^{(I)}: 1994–95

Herfølge

- Danish Superliga^{(I)}: 1999–2000
