= Ivo Staš =

Czech footballer (born 1965)

Personal information
- Date of birth: 10 February 1965 (age 61)
- Place of birth: Ostrava, Czechoslovakia
- Position: Defender

Senior career*
| Years | Team | Apps | (Gls) |
| 1982–1983 | Baník Ostrava | | |
| 1983–1985 | Dukla Prague | | |
| 1985–1990 | Baník Ostrava | | |
| 1991–1992 | Aston Villa | 0 | (0) |
| 1992–1993 | Baník Ostrava | | |
| 1993–1995 | Petra Drnovice | | |
| 1996–1997 | Vítkovice | | |

International career
- Czechoslovakia U21
| 1990 | Czechoslovakia | 1 | (0) |
- * Club domestic league appearances and goals

Ivo Staš (born 10 February 1965) is a former Czech footballer who played as a defender.

Staš signed for Aston Villa in 1991, but never played in any match due to an injury. After ending his playing career, he did not stay with top football and moved to the United States.
