= Richard Crisp =

English footballer

Personal information
- Date of birth: 23 May 1972 (age 54)
- Place of birth: Birmingham, England
- Position: Midfielder

Youth career
- 1987–1990: Aston Villa

Senior career*
Years	Team	Apps	(Gls)
1990–1994	Aston Villa	0	(0)
1993	→ Scunthorpe United (loan)	8	(0)
- Telford United
- Halesowen Town
- Stourport Swifts
- * Club domestic league appearances and goals

Richard Crisp (born 23 May 1972) is an English former professional footballer who played as a midfielder.

== Career ==
Born in Birmingham, Crisp began his career with hometown club Aston Villa in 1987, turning professional in 1990. Although he never made the first team, Crisp moved on loan to Scunthorpe United in March 1993, making 8 appearances in the Football League for them.

After leaving Aston Villa in 1994, Crisp later played non-league football for teams including Telford United, Halesowen Town and Stourport Swifts.
