= Gytis Padimanskas =

Lithuanian footballer

Personal information
- Date of birth: 13 May 1972 (age 54)
- Height: 1.91 m (6 ft 3 in)
- Position: Goalkeeper

Team information
- Current team: FK Sūduva

International career
Years	Team	Apps	(Gls)
2005–	Lithuania	7	(0)

Gytis Padimanskas (born 13 May 1972) is a Lithuanian professional footballer currently playing for A Lyga club FK Sūduva. He is 191 cm tall and weighs 85 kg.

Padimanskas has been the second-choice goalkeeper for Lithuania national football team since 2005, making seven appearances for the side.
