= Glen Livingstone =

English footballer

Personal information
- Date of birth: 13 October 1972 (age 54)
- Place of birth: Birmingham, England
- Height: 6 ft 2 in (1.88 m)

Youth career
- 1990–1991: Aston Villa

Senior career*
Years	Team	Apps	(Gls)
1991–1992	Aston Villa	0	(0)
1992–1993	York City	0	(0)
1993–1994	Walsall	3	(0)
Total		3	(0)

International career
1990	England U17	1	(0)
1990	England U18	2	(0)
1991	England U19	1	(0)
- * Club domestic league appearances and goals

Glen Livingstone (born 13 October 1972) is an English former professional footballer who played as a goalkeeper. Born in Birmingham, Livingstone played in the Football League for Walsall after spells with Aston Villa and York City.

Livingstone was part of England's squads for the European U18 Championship in 1990 and the World Youth Championship in 1991.
