= Alexandre Clot =

Swiss footballer (born 1972)

Personal information
- Date of birth: 9 September 1972 (age 54)
- Position: Midfielder

Senior career*
Years	Team	Apps	(Gls)
1992–1994	FC Sion		
1994–1995	FC Schaffhausen		
- * Club domestic league appearances and goals

Alexandre Clot (born 9 September 1972) is a retired Swiss football midfielder.
