= Huub Loeffen =

Dutch footballer

Huub Loeffen (born 11 January 1972) is a Dutch former professional footballer who played as a forward.

== Career ==
Loeffen was born in Appeltern, Gelderland. In 2001, he retired from professional football due to injuries at age 29. He had appeared in 216 league matches for TOP Oss, SBV Vitesse, FC Zwolle and Willem II.
