= Claudio Guerra (footballer, born 1972) =

Uruguayan footballer (born 1972)

Personal information
- Full name: Claudio Marcelo Guerra Carrizo
- Date of birth: 22 December 1972 (age 53)
- Place of birth: Montevideo, Uruguay
- Height: 1.73 m (5 ft 8 in)
- Position: Midfielder

Youth career
- Progreso

Senior career*
Years	Team	Apps	(Gls)
1993–1996	Progreso		
1996	Santiago Wanderers	8	(0)
1997	Progreso		
1998	Peñarol	3	(0)
1998	Aucas		
1999	Peñarol		
1999	Liverpool Montevideo		
2000	Juventud Las Piedras		
2000	Millonarios	1	(0)
2001	Santa Fe		
2001	Rentistas		
2002–2003	El Tanque Sisley		
2004–2006	Sud América		
2007	La Luz	9	(0)
- * Club domestic league appearances and goals

Claudio Marcelo Guerra Carrizo (born 22 December 1972) is a Uruguayan former footballer who played as a midfielder.

== Teams ==
Besides Uruguay, Guerra played for clubs in Chile, Ecuador and Colombia.

- (Uruguay) Progreso 1993–1995
- (Chile) Santiago Wanderers 1996
- (Uruguay) Progreso 1997
- (Ecuador) Aucas 1998
- (Uruguay) Peñarol 1998–1999
- (Uruguay) Liverpool 1999
- (Uruguay) Juventud Las Piedras 2000
- (Colombia) Millonarios 2000
- (Colombia) Independiente Santa Fe 2001
- (Uruguay) Rentistas 2001
- (Uruguay) El Tanque Sisley 2002–2003
- (Uruguay) Sud América 2004–2006
- (Uruguay) La Luz F.C. 2007
