= Andy Comyn =

English footballer

Personal information
- Full name: Andrew Comyn
- Date of birth: 2 August 1968 (age 58)
- Place of birth: Wakefield, England
- Position: Defender

Youth career
- Manchester United

Senior career*
Years	Team	Apps	(Gls)
- Alvechurch
1989–1991	Aston Villa	15	(0)
1991–1993	Derby County	63	(1)
1993–1995	Plymouth Argyle	76	(5)
1995–1996	West Bromwich Albion	3	(0)
- Hednesford Town
- Halesowen Town
Total		157	(6)
- * Club domestic league appearances and goals

Andrew Comyn (born 2 August 1968) is an English former professional footballer who played in the Football League for Aston Villa, Derby County, Plymouth Argyle and West Bromwich Albion.

== Playing career ==
Comyn joined Manchester United's youth team at the age of 16.

He was released by the club without playing for the first team and, after writing to a number of clubs in the Midlands, was offered a contract by Aston Villa. The club arranged digs in Shustoke and there Comyn would eventually share a room with Dwight Yorke.

He subsequently played for Derby County, Plymouth Argyle and West Bromwich Albion before leaving the professional game and playing semi-professionally for Hednesford Town and Halesowen Town.

== Subsequent career ==
During his playing career, Comyn undertook a course in book-keeping. In the latter stages of his playing career, he began working at an accountancy firm owned by John Baldwin, the manager of Hednesford Town. After retiring from playing, he worked for a number of leading accountancy companies, and in 2015 was appointed as vice-principal for financial strategy and control at Dudley College.
