= Aleksandr Gitselov =

Russian footballer (born 1963)

Personal information
- Full name: Aleksandr Vadimovich Gitselov
- Date of birth: 24 November 1963 (age 62)
- Height: 1.76 m (5 ft 9 in)
- Position: Forward

Youth career
- DYuSSh Raduga Taganrog
- ROShISP

Senior career*
Years	Team	Apps	(Gls)
1980	Torpedo Taganrog	8	(0)
1980–1981	SKA Rostov-on-Don	0	(0)
1981–1988	Rostselmash Rostov-on-Don	243	(84)
1988–1991	Torpedo Moscow	53	(7)
1991–1992	Zagłębie Lubin	24	(2)
1992	Torpedo Moscow	0	(0)
1992–1994	Östers IF	30	(11)
1994–1995	IFK Luleå	40	(26)
1996	Växjö Norra IF	20	(8)
1997	Olofströms IF		
1999	Högadals IS		
2000	IFK Karlshamn		
2001–2002	Rottne-Åby		
2003–2005	FK Älmeboda/Linneryd		
2008–2009	FC Växjö		
- * Club domestic league appearances and goals

Aleksandr Vadimovich Gitselov (Russian: Александр ВадимовичГицелов; born 24 November 1963) is a Russian footballer who plays as a forward.

== Club career ==
He made his professional debut in the Soviet Second League in 1981 for FC Rostselmash Rostov-on-Don. He played in the Soviet Top League for FC Torpedo Moscow from 1988 to 1991. He played for lower league Swedish clubs after 1995.

== Personal life ==
He is the father of Peter Gitselov.
