= 1996–97 Aston Villa F.C. season =

English football club season

Aston Villa F.C.
1996–97 season
- Chairman: Doug Ellis
- Manager: Brian Little
- Stadium: Villa Park
- FA Premier League: 5th
- FA Cup: Fourth round
- League Cup: Fourth round
- UEFA Cup: First round
- Top goalscorer: League: Dwight Yorke (17); All: Dwight Yorke (20)
- Highest home attendance: 39,339; FA Premier League: MUN (21 Sep 1996); CHE (27 Apr 1996); NEW (11 Jan 1997); LIV (2 Mar 1997); EVE (5 Apr 1997); TOT (19 Apr 1997); SOU (11 May 1997)
- Lowest home attendance: 25,006 vs Notts County (22 Jan 1997, FA Cup)
- Average home league attendance: 36,027
Home colours	Away colours	Third colours

The 1996–97 English football season was Aston Villa's 5th season in the Premier League. The season was Aston Villa's 122nd professional season, their 86th season in the top flight and their 9th consecutive season in the top tier of English football (the fifth in the FA Premier League).

There was no silverware this season for last season's League Cup winners, but Brian Little's competent Villa side achieved UEFA Cup qualification for the second season running, but this time via the UEFA Respect Fair Play ranking.

The autumn of the season saw the departure of veteran defender Paul McGrath to Derby County, while the injured Gary Charles was replaced at right-back by the Portuguese Fernando Nelson. The end of the season saw the arrival of Liverpool striker Stan Collymore for a club record fee of £7 million. Club record signing Sasa Curcic, who had been disappointing after his £4million arrival in the summer of 1996, was then sold to Crystal Palace for £1million.

Long-serving defender Paul McGrath left in the autumn to sign for Derby County after more than seven years at Villa Park. Another Villa defender, Phil King, who had been restricted to just three league appearances in as many years at the club, was transferred to Swindon Town. Striker Tommy Johnson, whose first team chances were becoming increasingly limited, was sold to Celtic. Franz Carr left after just over a year at Villa Park to join Reggiana of Italy. Defender Carl Tiler was sold to Sheffield United for £500,000 after just 18 months at the club, having played just 12 league games due to injury.

Dwight Yorke was Villa's top scorer for the second season running, with 17 goals in the Premier League and 20 in all competitions.

== FA Premier League ==
Pos	Team	Pld	W	D	L	GF	GA	GD	Pts	Qualification or relegation
3	Arsenal	38	19	11	8	62	32	+30	68	Qualification for the UEFA Cup first round (Note: Aston Villa was rewarded entry to the UEFA Cup through UEFA Fair Play ranking.)
4	Liverpool	38	19	11	8	62	37	+25	68	Qualification for the UEFA Cup first round
5	Aston Villa	38	17	10	11	47	34	+13	61	Qualification for the UEFA Cup first round
6	Chelsea	38	16	11	11	58	55	+3	59	Qualification for the Cup Winners' Cup first round (Note: Chelsea qualified for the Cup Winners' Cup as FA Cup winners.)
7	Sheffield Wednesday	38	14	15	9	50	51	−1	57	

Source: Premier League
Rules for classification: 1) points; 2) goal difference; 3) number of goals scored.

=== Matches ===
Aston Villa's score comes first

Win	Draw	Loss

Date	Opponent	Venue	Result	Attendance	Scorers
17 August 1996	Sheffield Wednesday	A	1–2	26,861	Johnson 88'
21 August 1996	Blackburn Rovers	H	1–0	32,457	Southgate 64'
24 August 1996	Derby County	H	2–0	34,646	Joachim 19', Johnson pen 47'
4 September 1996	Everton	A	1–0	39,115	Ehiogu 62'
7 September 1996	Arsenal	H	2–2	37,944	Milošević 39', 63'
15 September 1996	Chelsea	A	1–1	27,729	Townsend 18'
21 September 1996	Manchester United	H	0–0	39,339	
30 September 1996	Newcastle United	A	3–4	36,400	Yorke 4', 59', 70'
12 October 1996	Tottenham Hotspur	A	0–1	32,847	
19 October 1996	Leeds United	H	2–0	39,051	Yorke 58', Johnson 65'
26 October 1996	Sunderland	A	0–1	21,059	
2 November 1996	Nottingham Forest	H	2–0	35,310	Tiler 20', Yorke 65'
16 November 1996	Leicester City	H	1–3	36,193	Yorke 15'
23 November 1996	Coventry City	A	2–1	21,340	Joachim 29', Staunton 85'
30 November 1996	Middlesbrough	H	1–0	39,053	Yorke 39' (pen)
4 December 1996	West Ham United	A	2–0	19,105	Ehiogu 38', Yorke 74'
7 December 1996	Southampton	A	1–0	15,232	Townsend 34'
22 December 1996	Wimbledon	H	5–0	28,875	Yorke 38', 86', Milošević 42', 75', Taylor 61'
26 December 1996	Chelsea	H	0–2	39,339	
28 December 1996	Arsenal	A	2–2	38,130	Milošević 68', Yorke 74'
1 January 1997	Manchester United	A	0–0	55,133	
11 January 1997	Newcastle United	H	2–2	39,339	Yorke 39', Milošević 52'
18 January 1997	Liverpool	A	0–3	40,489	
29 January 1997	Sheffield Wednesday	H	0–1	26,726	
1 February 1997	Sunderland	H	1–0	32,491	Milošević 37'
19 February 1997	Coventry City	H	2–1	30,409	Yorke 43', 75'
22 February 1997	Nottingham Forest	A	0–0	25,239	
2 March 1997	Liverpool	H	1–0	39,339	Taylor 83'
5 March 1997	Leicester City	A	0–1	20,626	
15 March 1997	West Ham United	H	0–0	35,992	
22 March 1997	Blackburn Rovers	A	2–0	24,274	Johnson 64', Yorke 79'
5 April 1997	Everton	H	3–1	39,339	Milošević 41', Staunton 50', Yorke 54'
9 April 1997	Wimbledon	A	2–0	9,015	Milošević 26', Wright 78'
12 April 1997	Derby County	A	1–2	18,071	Joachim 84'
19 April 1997	Tottenham Hotspur	H	1–1	39,339	Yorke 81'
22 April 1997	Leeds United	A	0–0	26,897	
3 May 1997	Middlesbrough	A	2–3	30,074	Ehiogu 58', Milošević 75'
11 May 1997	Southampton	H	1–0	39,339	Dryden 12' (own goal)

Results by round

Match	1	2	3	4	5	6	7	8	9	10	11	12	13	14	15	16	17	18	19	20	21	22	23	24	25	26	27	28	29	30	31	32	33	34	35	36	37	38
Ground	A	H	H	A	H	A	H	A	A	H	A	H	H	A	H	A	A	H	H	A	A	H	A	H	H	H	A	H	A	H	A	H	A	A	H	A	A	H
Result	L	W	W	W	D	D	D	L	L	W	L	W	L	W	W	W	W	W	L	D	D	D	L	L	W	W	D	W	L	D	W	W	W	L	D	D	L	W
Position	15	10	3	2	4	7	6	8	8	7	7	7	9	8	7	5	4	4	5	6	6	6	7	7	7	5	5	5	5	6	5	5	4	4	5	5	5	5

Source: Statto.com
A = Away; H = Home; W = Win; D = Draw; L = Loss

== FA Cup ==
14 January 1997 R3	Notts County	0-0	Aston Villa	Nottingham
12:00				Stadium: Meadow Lane; Attendance: 13,315

28 January 1996 R3R	Aston Villa	3-0	Notts County	Birmingham
19:45			Yorke 24' 53'; Ehiogu 67'	Stadium: Villa Park; Attendance: 25,006

25 January 1997 R4	Derby County	3-1	Aston Villa	Derby
15:00	van der Laan 36'; Sturridge 40'; Willems 69'		Ćurčić 76'	Stadium: Baseball Ground; Attendance: 17,977; Referee: Roger Dilkes

== League Cup ==
23 October 1996 R3	Leeds United	1-2	Aston Villa	Leeds
19:45	Sharpe 69'		Taylor 70'; Yorke 77' (pen.)	Stadium: Elland Road; Attendance: 15,803

26 November 1996 R4	Wimbledon	1-0	Aston Villa	London
19:45	Gayle 44'			Stadium: Selhurst Park; Attendance: 7,573

== UEFA Cup ==
10 September 1996 R1 L1	Aston Villa	1-1	Helsingborg	Birmingham
19:45	Johnson 14'		Wibrån 81'	Stadium: Villa Park; Attendance: 25,818; Referee: Loizos Loizou

24 September 1996 R1 L2	Helsingborg	0-0 (*1-1 agg.)	Aston Villa	Helsingborg
19:45				Stadium: Olympia; Attendance: 10,213; Referee: Roger Philippi

== Squad ==
#	Name	Position	Nationality	Place of birth	Date of birth (age)	Signed from	Date signed	Fee	Apps	Gls
Goalkeepers
1	Mark Bosnich	GK	(Australia)	Liverpool	13 January 1972 (aged 24)	(Australia) Sydney Croatia	28 February 1992	Free transfer	145	0
13	Michael Oakes	GK	(England)	Northwich	30 October 1973 (aged 22)	Academy	1 July 1991	—N/a	1	0
30	Adam Rachel	GK	(England)	Birmingham	30 December 1976 (aged 19)	Academy	1 July 1995	—N/a	0	0
31	Stuart Brock	GK	(England)	West Bromwich	26 September 1976 (aged 19)	Academy	1 July 1996	—N/a	-	-
Defenders
2	Gary Charles	RB	(England)	Newham	13 April 1970 (aged 26)	Derby County	6 January 1995	£1,450,000	63	1
3	Steve Staunton	LB	(Republic of Ireland)	Dundalk	19 January 1969 (aged 27)	Liverpool	7 August 1991	£1,100,000	190	13
4	Gareth Southgate	CB	(England)	Watford	3 September 1970 (aged 25)	Crystal Palace	1 July 1995	£3,500,000	43	2
5	Paul McGrath	CB	(Republic of Ireland)	(England) Greenford	4 December 1959 (aged 36)	Manchester United	3 August 1989	£400,000	306	10
14	Alan Wright	LB	(England)	Ashton-under-Lyne	28 September 1971 (aged 24)	Blackburn Rovers	10 March 1995	£1,000,000	59	2
15	Fernando Nélson	RB	(Portugal)	Porto	5 November 1971 (aged 24)	(Portugal) Sporting	2 August 1996	£1,700,000	-	-
16	Ugo Ehiogu	CB	(England)	Hackney	3 November 1972 (aged 23)	West Bromwich Albion	12 July 1991	£40,000	131	6
18	Carl Tiler	CB	(England)	Sheffield	11 February 1970 (aged 26)	Nottingham Forest	28 October 1995	£750,000	1	0
20	Riccardo Scimeca	CB	(England)	Leamington Spa	13 June 1975 (aged 21)	Academy	1 July 1995	—N/a	22	0
22	Phil King	LB	(England)	Bristol	28 December 1967 (aged 28)	Sheffield Wednesday	1 August 1994	£200,000	23	0
27	David Hughes	LB	(Wales)	Wrexham	1 February 1978 (aged 18)	Academy	1 July 1996	—N/a	-	-
Midfielders
6	Andy Townsend (c)	CM	(Republic of Ireland)	(England) Maidstone	26 July 1963 (aged 32)	Chelsea	26 July 1993	£2,100,000	131	9
7	Ian Taylor	CM	(England)	Birmingham	4 June 1968 (aged 28)	Sheffield Wednesday	21 December 1994	£1,000,000	59	6
8	Mark Draper	CM	(England)	Long Eaton	11 November 1970 (aged 25)	Leicester City	5 July 1995	£3,250,000	49	5
17	Lee Hendrie	RM	(England)	Solihull	18 May 1977 (aged 19)	Academy	1 July 1995	—N/a	3	0
19	Gareth Farrelly	LM	(Republic of Ireland)	Dublin	28 August 1975 (aged 20)	Academy	1 July 1995	—N/a	6	0
24	Scott Murray	RM	(Scotland)	Fraserburgh	26 May 1974 (aged 22)	Academy	1 July 1995	—N/a	3	0
26	Saša Ćurčić	DM	(Federal Republic of Yugoslavia)	Belgrade	14 February 1972 (aged 24)	Bolton Wanderers	1 July 1995	£4.000.000	-	-
Forwards
9	Savo Milošević	CF	(Federal Republic of Yugoslavia)	Bijeljina	2 September 1973 (aged 22)	(Federal Republic of Yugoslavia) Partizan	26 June 1995	£3,500,000	49	14
10	Dwight Yorke	CF	(Trinidad and Tobago)	Canaan	3 November 1971 (aged 24)	(Trinidad and Tobago) Signal Hill	19 July 1991	£120,000	194	62
11	Tommy Johnson	CF	(England)	Gateshead	15 January 1971 (aged 25)	Derby County	6 January 1995	£1,450,000	46	12
12	Julian Joachim	CF	(England)	Peterborough	20 September 1974 (aged 21)	Leicester City	24 February 1996	£1,890,000	11	1
23	Neil Davis	CF	(England)	Bloxwich	15 August 1973 (aged 22)	Academy	1 July 1995	—N/a	3	0
—N/a	Franz Carr	RW	(England)	Preston	24 September 1966 (aged 29)	Leicester City	10 February 1995	£250,000	4	1

Note: Stats and ages are correct as of July 1, 1996.

=== Transferred in ===
Date	Pos	Player	From	Fee
2 August 1996	RB	(Portugal) Fernando Nélson	(Portugal) Sporting	£1,700,000
23 August 1996	DM	(Federal Republic of Yugoslavia) Saša Ćurčić	Bolton Wanderers	£4,000,000
				£5,700,000

Record

=== Loaned in ===
Date	Pos	Player	From	Loan End

=== Transferred out ===
Date	Pos	Player	To	Fee
3 July 1996	CB	(Scotland) Paul Browne	(Scotland) Raith Rovers	£70,000
1 October 1996	CB	(Republic of Ireland) Paul McGrath	Derby County	£100,000
1 October 1996	RW	Franz Carr	(Italy) Reggiana	Free transfer
26 March 1997	LB	Phil King	Swindon Town	Free transfer
26 March 1997	CB	Carl Tiler	Sheffield United	£650,000
27 March 1997	CF	Tommy Johnson	(Scotland) Celtic	£2,300,000
				£3,120,000

=== Loaned out ===
Date	Pos	Player	To	Loan End
27 October 1996	CF	Neil Davis	Wycombe Wanderers	25 January 1997

=== Overall transfer activity ===
Expenditure ▼£5,700,000

Income ▲£3,120,000

Balance ▼£2,580,000

== Kit ==
Kit Supplier	Sponsor
<< Reebok >>	AST Computer
