= 1994–95 Aston Villa F.C. season =

English football club season

Aston Villa F.C.
1994–95 season
- Chairman: Doug Ellis
- Manager: Ron Atkinson (until 10 Nov); Jim Barron (caretaker 10-25 Nov); Brian Little (from 25 November)
- Stadium: Villa Park
- FA Premier League: 18th
- FA Cup: Fourth round
- League Cup: Fourth round
- UEFA Cup: Second round
- Top goalscorer: League: Dean Saunders (15); All: Dean Saunders (17)
- Highest home attendance: 40,154 vs Liverpool (6 May 1995, Premier League)
- Lowest home attendance: 12,433 vs Wigan Athletic (21 Sep 1994, League Cup)
- Average home league attendance: 29,756
Home colours	Away colours	Third colours

The 1994–95 English football season was Aston Villa's 3rd season in the Premier League. The season was Aston Villa's 120th professional season, their 84th season in the top flight and their 7th consecutive season in the top tier of English football including their time the Football League First Division.

Two seasons earlier, Aston Villa narrowly missed out on the league title. The season after that, they dipped to 10th place in the league but still had success as League Cup winners. But the decline continued into 1994–95 and Ron Atkinson paid with his job in November. Within days, former Villa favourite Brian Little was back at the club. Little managed to keep Villa clear of the drop.

Before the season was over, a new era was already in the making at Villa Park. A number of players now past their best were off-loaded to new clubs; these included Ray Houghton, Garry Parker, Kevin Richardson and Earl Barrett. The close season saw more players from the Atkinson era pass through the Villa Park exit door: Shaun Teale, Dalian Atkinson, Dean Saunders and John Fashanu.

Little brought in younger players like Alan Wright (260), Ian Taylor (233), Mark Draper (120), Gary Charles (107), Savo Milosevic (90), Nii Lamptey (10), and Carl Tiler (12) to give some much-needed strength to a side of fading stars, as well as giving such much-needed hope to fans of a club which had been rescued from the threat of a rapid decline. Defender Tiler was sold to Sheffield United for £500,000 after just 18 months at the club, having played just 12 league games due to injury.

== Kit ==
Kit Supplier	Sponsor
<< Asics >>	Müller*

*Aston Villa's kits were amended to include "yogurt" under Müller for their matches televised on Sky Sports.

== Transfers ==
=== Transferred in ===
Date	Pos	Player	From	Fee
1 August 1994	LB	Phil King	Sheffield Wednesday	£200,000
3 August 1994	AM	(Ghana) Nii Lamptey	(Netherlands) PSV Eindhoven	£200,000
4 August 1994	CF	John Fashanu	Wimbledon	£1,350,000
21 December 1994	CM	Ian Taylor	Sheffield Wednesday	£1,000,000
6 January 1995	RB	Gary Charles	Derby County	£1,450,000
6 January 1995	CF	Tommy Johnson	Derby County	£1,450,000
10 February 1995	CF	Franz Carr	Leicester City	£250,000
10 March 1995	LB	Alan Wright	Blackburn Rovers	£1,000,000
				£6,900,000

=== Loaned in ===
Date	Pos	Player	From	Loan End

=== Transferred out ===
Date	Pos	Player	To	Fee
6 July 1994	RW	Tony Daley	Wolverhampton Wanderers	£1,250,000
1 July 1994	AM	(Germany) Stefan Beinlich	(Germany) Hansa Rostock	£190,000
1 July 1994	AM	(Germany) Matthias Breitkreutz	(Germany) Hansa Rostock	£190,000
11 July 1994	LW	Steve Froggatt	Wolverhampton Wanderers	£1,000,000
14 July 1994	RB	(Poland) Dariusz Kubicki	Sunderland	£100,000
19 July 1994	RB	Neil Cox	Middlesbrough	£1,000,000
21 December 1994	CF	Guy Whittingham	Sheffield Wednesday	£700,000
30 January 1995	RB	Earl Barrett	Everton	£1,700,000
10 February 1995	CM	Garry Parker	Leicester City	£300,000
16 February 1995	CM	Kevin Richardson	Coventry City	£300,000
23 March 1995	CM	(Republic of Ireland) Ray Houghton	Crystal Palace	£300,000
24 March 1995	CB	Chris Boden	Derby County	£150,000
				£7,180,000

=== Loaned out ===
Date	Pos	Player	To	Loan End
9 September 1994	LB	Bryan Small	Birmingham City	9 November 1994
21 March 1995	LM	Gareth Farrelly	Rotherham United	31 May 1995

=== Overall transfer activity ===
==== Expenditure ====
▼£6,900,000

==== Income ====
▲£7,180,000

==== Balance ====
▲£280,000

== Squad ==
=== First Team ===
#	Name	Position	Nationality	Place of birth	Date of birth (age)	Signed from	Date signed	Fee	Apps	Gls
Goalkeepers
1	Nigel Spink	GK	(England)	Chelmsford	8 August 1958 (aged 35)	Chelmsford City	4 January 1977	£4,000	432	0
13	Mark Bosnich	GK	(Australia)	Liverpool	13 January 1972 (aged 22)	(Australia) Sydney Croatia	28 February 1992	Free transfer	60	0
30	Michael Oakes	GK	(England)	Northwich	30 October 1973 (aged 20)	Academy	1 July 1991	—N/a	0	0
Defenders
2	Earl Barrett	RB	(England)	Rochdale	28 April 1967 (aged 27)	Oldham Athletic	25 February 1992	£1,700,000	116	2
2*	Alan Wright	LB	(England)	Ashton-under-Lyne	28 September 1971 (aged 22)	Blackburn Rovers	10 March 1995	£1,000,000	-	-
3	Steve Staunton	LB	(Republic of Ireland)	Dundalk	19 January 1969 (aged 25)	Liverpool	7 August 1991	£1,100,000	126	7
4	Shaun Teale	CB	(England)	Southport	10 March 1964 (aged 30)	Bournemouth	25 July 1991	£300,000	147	5
5	Paul McGrath	CB	(Republic of Ireland)	(England) Greenford	4 December 1959 (aged 34)	Manchester United	3 August 1989	£400,000	219	8
15	Phil King	LB	(England)	Bristol	28 December 1967 (aged 26)	Sheffield Wednesday	1 August 1994	£200,000	-	-
16	Ugo Ehiogu	CB	(England)	Hackney	3 November 1972 (aged 21)	West Bromwich Albion	12 July 1991	£40,000	33	0
20	Bryan Small	LB	(England)	Birmingham	15 November 1971 (aged 22)	Academy	1 July 1990	—N/a	38	0
22*	Gary Charles	RB	(England)	Newham	13 April 1970 (aged 24)	Derby County	6 January 1995	£1,450,000	-	-
24	Chris Boden	CB	(England)	Wolverhampton	13 October 1973 (aged 20)	Academy	1 January 1992	—N/a	0	0
Midfielders
6	Kevin Richardson (c)	CM	(England)	Newcastle upon Tyne	4 December 1962 (aged 31)	(Spain) Real Sociedad	6 August 1991	£450,000	155	10
7	Ray Houghton	RM/CM	(Republic of Ireland)	(Scotland) Glasgow	9 January 1962 (aged 32)	Liverpool	28 July 1992	£900,000	87	9
11	Andy Townsend	CM	(Republic of Ireland)	(England) Maidstone	26 July 1963 (aged 30)	Chelsea	26 July 1993	£2,100,000	47	4
12	Nii Lamptey	AM	(Ghana)	Tema	10 December 1974 (aged 19)	(Netherlands) PSV Eindhoven	3 August 1994	£200,000	-	-
14	Garry Parker	CM	(England)	Oxford	7 September 1965 (aged 28)	Nottingham Forest	29 November 1991	£650,000	99	13
17	Ian Taylor	CM	(England)	Birmingham	4 June 1968 (aged 26)	Sheffield Wednesday	21 December 1994	£1,000,000	-	-
19	Graham Fenton	AM	(England)	Whitley Bay	22 May 1974 (aged 20)	Academy	1 July 1993	—N/a	14	1
21	David Farrell	CM	(England)	Birmingham	11 November 1971 (aged 22)	Redditch United	6 January 1992	£45,000	6	0
Forwards
8	John Fashanu	CF	(England)	Kensington	18 September 1962 (aged 31)	Wimbledon	4 August 1994	£1,350,000	-	-
9	Dean Saunders	CF	(Wales)	Swansea	21 June 1964 (aged 30)	Liverpool	19 July 1991	£2,300,000	96	34
10	Dalian Atkinson	CF	(England)	Shrewsbury	21 March 1968 (aged 26)	(Spain) Real Sociedad	11 July 1991	£1,600,000	92	29
14*	Franz Carr	RW	(England)	Preston	24 September 1966 (aged 27)	Leicester City	10 February 1995	£250,000	-	-
18	Dwight Yorke	CF	(Trinidad and Tobago)	Canaan	3 November 1971 (aged 22)	(Trinidad and Tobago) Signal Hill	19 July 1991	£120,000	103	29
22	Guy Whittingham	CF	(England)	Evesham	10 November 1964 (aged 29)	Portsmouth	3 August 1993	£1,300,000	21	3
25	Tommy Johnson	CF	(England)	Gateshead	15 January 1971 (aged 23)	Derby County	6 January 1995	£1,450,000	-	-

*squad number was re-used following a players departure.
Note: Stats and ages are correct as of July 1, 1994.

== Results ==
=== Premier League ===
Pos	Team	Pld	W	D	L	GF	GA	GD	Pts	Qualification or relegation
16	Coventry City	42	12	14	16	44	62	−18	50	
17	Manchester City	42	12	13	17	53	64	−11	49	
18	Aston Villa	42	11	15	16	51	56	−5	48	
19	Crystal Palace (R)	42	11	12	19	34	49	−15	45	Relegation to Football League First Division (Note: The Premier League relegated 4 teams while the Football League First Division only promoted 2 teams due to the Premier League contracting from 22 teams to 20 teams for the following season.)
20	Norwich City (R)	42	10	13	19	37	54	−17	43	Relegation to Football League First Division

Source: Premier League
Rules for classification: 1) points; 2) goal difference; 3) number of goals scored.
(R) Relegated

==== Results by round ====
Match	1	2	3	4	5	6	7	8	9	10	11	12	13	14	15	16	17	18	19	20	21	22	23	24	25	26	27	28	29	30	31	32	33	34	35	36	37	38	39	40	41	42
Ground	A	H	H	A	H	A	A	H	A	H	H	A	H	A	A	H	A	H	A	A	H	A	H	H	A	H	A	H	A	H	A	H	H	H	A	A	A	H	A	H	H	A
Result	D	D	D	W	W	L	L	L	L	D	L	L	L	L	W	D	D	D	L	D	W	D	D	W	W	W	L	W	W	D	L	L	D	L	W	D	L	L	L	D	W	D
Position	7	12	13	9	8	8	9	12	14	15	16	18	19	19	19	19	19	20	20	20	19	20	19	18	14	12	14	11	9	9	11	11	10	15	13	11	16	16	17	18	15	18

Source: Statto.com
A = Away; H = Home; W = Win; D = Draw; L = Loss

==== Matches ====
20 August 1994 1	Everton	2-2	Aston Villa	Liverpool
15:00	Stuart 22'; Rideout 70'	Report	Fashanu 65'; Saunders 74'	Stadium: Goodison Park; Attendance: 35,544; Referee: Kelvin Morton

24 August 1994 2	Aston Villa	1-1	Southampton	Birmingham
19:45	Saunders 32'	Report	Le Tissier 89'	Stadium: Villa Park; Attendance: 24,179; Referee: Philip Don

27 August 1994 3	Aston Villa	1-1	Crystal Palace	Birmingham
15:00	Staunton 46'	Report	Southgate 87'	Stadium: Villa Park; Attendance: 23,305; Referee: Joe Worrall

29 August 1994 4	Coventry City	0-1	Aston Villa	Coventry
20:00		Report	Yorke 3'	Stadium: Highfield Road; Attendance: 12,218; Referee: Paul Durkin

10 September 1994 5	Aston Villa	2-0	Ipswich Town	Birmingham
15:00	Staunton 15'; Saunders 85'	Report		Stadium: Villa Park; Attendance: 22,241; Referee: Gary Willard

17 September 1994 6	West Ham United	1-0	Aston Villa	London
15:00	Cottee 86'	Report		Stadium: Boleyn Ground; Attendance: 18,326; Referee: Stephen Lodge

24 September 1994 7	Blackburn Rovers	3-1	Aston Villa	Blackburn
15:00	Shearer 17' (pen.) 72'; Sutton 56'	Report	Ehiogu 90'	Stadium: Ewood Park; Attendance: 22,694; Referee: Martin Bodenham

1 October 1994 8	Aston Villa	0-2	Newcastle United	Birmingham
15:00		Report	Lee 66'; Cole 83'	Stadium: Villa Park; Attendance: 29,960; Referee: Dermot Gallagher

8 October 1994 9	Liverpool	3-2	Aston Villa	Liverpool
15:00	Ruddock 20'; Fowler 26' 57'	Report	Staunton 37'; Whittingham 90'	Stadium: Anfield; Attendance: 32,158; Referee: Brian Hill

15 October 1994 10	Aston Villa	1-1	Norwich City	Birmingham
15:00	Saunders 62'	Report	Milligan 50'	Stadium: Villa Park; Attendance: 22,468; Referee: Alan Wilkie

22 October 1994 11	Aston Villa	0-2	Nottingham Forest	Birmingham
15:00		Report	Pearce 1' (pen.); Stone 70'	Stadium: Villa Park; Attendance: 29,217; Referee: Keith Cooper

29 October 1994 12	Queens Park Rangers	2-0	Aston Villa	London
15:00	Dichio 36'; Penrice 90'	Report		Stadium: Loftus Road; Attendance: 16,073; Referee: Robbie Hart

6 November 1994 13	Aston Villa	1-2	Manchester United	Birmingham
16:00	Atkinson 29'	Report	Ince 44'; Kanchelskis 51'	Stadium: Villa Park; Attendance: 32,136; Referee: Philip Don

9 November 1994 14	Wimbledon	4-3	Aston Villa	London
19:45	Barton 8' (pen.); Ardley 65'; Jones 83'; Leonhardsen 90'	Report	Parker 19'; Saunders 38' 50'	Stadium: Selhurst Park; Attendance: 6,221; Referee: David Elleray

19 November 1994 15	Tottenham Hotspur	3-4	Aston Villa	London
15:00	Sheringham 40'; Klinsmann 53' (pen.); Bosnich 74' (o.g.)	Report	Atkinson 8'; Fenton 21' 27'; Saunders 90'	Stadium: White Hart Lane; Attendance: 26,899; Referee: Paul Durkin

27 November 1994 16	Aston Villa	1-1	Sheffield Wednesday	Birmingham
16:00	Atkinson 15'	Report	Atherton 57'	Stadium: Villa Park; Attendance: 25,082; Referee: Graham Poll

3 December 1994 17	Leicester City	1-1	Aston Villa	Leicester
15:00	Gee 5'	Report	Whittingham 61'	Stadium: Filbert Street; Attendance: 20,896; Referee: Martin Bodenham

10 December 1994 18	Aston Villa	0-0	Everton	Birmingham
15:00		Report		Stadium: Villa Park; Attendance: 29,678; Referee: Rodger Gifford

19 December 1994 19	Southampton	2-1	Aston Villa	Southampton
20:00	Hall 8'; Le Tissier 90'	Report	Houghton 80'	Stadium: The Dell; Attendance: 13,874; Referee: Stephen Lodge

26 December 1994 20	Arsenal	0-0	Aston Villa	London
12:00		Report		Stadium: Highbury; Attendance: 34,452; Referee: Kelvin Morton

28 December 1994 21	Aston Villa	3-0	Chelsea	Birmingham
19:45	Sinclair 9' (o.g.); Yorke 32'; Taylor 82'	Report		Stadium: Villa Park; Attendance: 32,901; Referee: Keith Burge

31 December 1994 22	Manchester City	2-2	Aston Villa	Manchester
15:00	Rösler 14' 54'	Report	Brightwell 55' (o.g.); Saunders 59'	Stadium: Maine Road; Attendance: 22,513; Referee: Joe Worrall

2 January 1995 23	Aston Villa	0-0	Leeds United	Birmingham
15:00		Report		Stadium: Villa Park; Attendance: 35,038; Referee: Paul Danson

14 January 1995 24	Aston Villa	2-1	Queens Park Rangers	Birmingham
15:00	Fashanu 7'; Ehiogu 76'	Report	Yates 88'	Stadium: Villa Park; Attendance: 26,578; Referee: Alan Wilkie

21 January 1995 25	Nottingham Forest	1-2	Aston Villa	West Bridgford
15:00	Collymore 53' (pen.)	Report	Fashanu 32'; Saunders 86'	Stadium: City Ground; Attendance: 24,598; Referee: Keith Cooper

25 January 1995 26	Aston Villa	1-0	Tottenham Hotspur	Birmingham
19:45	Saunders 18'	Report		Stadium: Villa Park; Attendance: 40,017; Referee: Robbie Hart

4 February 1995 27	Manchester United	1-0	Aston Villa	Greater Manchester
15:00	Cole 18'	Report		Stadium: Old Trafford; Attendance: 43,795; Referee: David Elleray

11 February 1995 28	Aston Villa	7-1	Wimbledon	Birmingham
15:00	Reeves 12' (o.g.); Johnson 22' 26' 38'; Saunders 48' 66' (pen.); Yorke 83'	Report	Barton 11'	Stadium: Villa Park; Attendance: 23,982; Referee: Brian Hill

18 February 1995 29	Sheffield Wednesday	1-2	Aston Villa	Sheffield
15:00	Bright 71'	Report	Saunders 26' 44'	Stadium: Hillsborough; Attendance: 24,063; Referee: Dermot Gallagher

22 February 1995 30	Aston Villa	4-4	Leicester City	Birmingham
19:45	Saunders 8'; Staunton 37'; Yorke 60'; Johnson 65'	Report	Robins 61'; Roberts 77'; Lowe 80' 90'	Stadium: Villa Park; Attendance: 30,825; Referee: Kelvin Morton

25 February 1995 31	Newcastle United	3-1	Aston Villa	Newcastle upon Tyne
15:00	Venison 31'; Beardsley 55' 66'	Report	Townsend 40'	Stadium: St James' Park; Attendance: 34,637; Referee: Philip Don

4 March 1995 32	Aston Villa	0-1	Blackburn Rovers	Birmingham
15:00		Report	Hendry 12'	Stadium: Villa Park; Attendance: 40,114; Referee: Rodger Gifford

6 March 1995 33	Aston Villa	0-0	Coventry City	Birmingham
20:00		Report		Stadium: Villa Park; Attendance: 26,186; Referee: Graham Poll

18 March 1995 34	Aston Villa	0-2	West Ham United	Birmingham
15:00		Report	Moncur 11'; Hutchison 49'	Stadium: Villa Park; Attendance: 28,682; Referee: Martin Bodenham

1 April 1995 35	Ipswich Town	0-1	Aston Villa	Ipswich
15:00		Report	Swailes 90' (o.g.)	Stadium: Portman Road; Attendance: 15,710; Referee: Joe Worrall

4 April 1995 36	Crystal Palace	0-0	Aston Villa	London
19:45		Report		Stadium: Selhurst Park; Attendance: 12,606; Referee: Keith Cooper

15 April 1995 37	Chelsea	1-0	Aston Villa	London
15:00	Stein 41'	Report		Stadium: Stamford Bridge; Attendance: 17,015; Referee: Keith Burge

17 April 1995 38	Aston Villa	0-4	Arsenal	Birmingham
15:00		Report	Hartson 31' 87'; Wright 33' 72' (pen.)	Stadium: Villa Park; Attendance: 32,005; Referee: Kelvin Morton

29 April 1995 39	Leeds United	1-0	Aston Villa	Leeds
15:00	Palmer 90'	Report		Stadium: Elland Road; Attendance: 32,955; Referee: David Elleray

3 May 1995 40	Aston Villa	1-1	Manchester City	Birmingham
19:45	Ehiogu 9'	Report	Rösler 63'	Stadium: Villa Park; Attendance: 30,133; Referee: Stephen Lodge

6 May 1995 41	Aston Villa	2-0	Liverpool	Birmingham
15:00	Yorke 25' 36'	Report		Stadium: Villa Park; Attendance: 40,154; Referee: Robbie Hart

14 May 1995 42	Norwich City	1-1	Aston Villa	Norwich
16:00	Goss 56'	Report	Staunton 7'	Stadium: Carrow Road; Attendance: 19,374; Referee: Keith Cooper

=== FA Cup ===
7 January 1995 R3	Barnsley	0-2	Aston Villa	Barnsley
			Yorke 48'; Saunders 64'	Stadium: Oakwell; Attendance: 11,469

28 January 1995 R4	Manchester City	1-0	Aston Villa	Manchester
	Walsh			Stadium: Maine Road; Attendance: 21,177

=== League Cup ===
21 September 1994 R2 L1	Aston Villa	5-0	Wigan Athletic	Birmingham
	Yorke 4'; Atkinson 26' 85'; Saunders 70'; Lamptey 73'			Stadium: Villa Park; Attendance: 12,433

5 October 1994 R2 L2	Wigan Athletic	0-3 (0-8 agg.)	Aston Villa	Wigan
			Lamptey 43' 85'; Whittingham 60'	Stadium: Springfield Park; Attendance: 2,633

26 October 1994 R3	Aston Villa	1-0	Middlesbrough	Birmingham
	Townsend 30'			Stadium: Villa Park; Attendance: 19,254

30 November 1994 R4	Crystal Palace	4-1	Aston Villa	London
	Armstrong; Southgate		Atkinson 33'	Stadium: Selhurst Park; Attendance: 12,653

=== UEFA Cup ===
15 September 1994 R1 L1	Inter Milan (Italy)	1-0	(England) Aston Villa	Milan
	Bergkamp 76' (pen.)			Stadium: San Siro; Attendance: 22,639; Referee: Peter Mikkelsen

29 September 1994 R1 L2	Aston Villa (England)	1-0 (a.e.t.) (1-1 agg.) (4-3 p)	(Italy) Inter Milan	Birmingham
	Houghton 41'			Stadium: Villa Park; Attendance: 30,533
	Penalties
	(penalty scored) Parker; (penalty scored) Staunton; (penalty scored) Townsend; (penalty missed) Whittingham; (penalty scored) King		(penalty scored) Bia; (penalty scored) Bergkamp; (penalty scored) Seno; (penalty missed) Fontolan; (penalty missed) Sosa

18 October 1994 R2 L1	Trabzonspor (Turkey)	1-0	(England) Aston Villa	Trabzon
	Kanyak 76'			Stadium: Hüseyin Avni Aker; Attendance: 27,500; Referee: Referee: Michel Piraux

1 November 1994 R2 L2	Aston Villa (England)	2-1 (2-2* agg.)	(Turkey) Trabzonspor	Birmingham
	Atkinson 77'; Ehiogu 90+3'		Kanyak 90+2'	Stadium: Villa Park; Attendance: 23,858; Referee: Joël Quiniou

== Statistics ==
=== Appearances ===
Rank	#	Nat	Player	Pos	Apps	Premier League		FA Cup		League Cup		UEFA Cup		Total	
Rank	#	Nat	Player	Pos	Apps	XI	Sub	XI	Sub	XI	Sub	XI	Sub	XI	Sub
1	5	(Republic of Ireland)	Paul McGrath	CB	49	36	4	2	0	3	0	4	0	45	4
2	9	(Wales)	Dean Saunders	CF	48	39	0	2	0	3	0	4	0	48	0
3	16	(England)	Ugo Ehiogu	CB	48	38	1	2	0	3	0	4	0	47	1
4	3	(Republic of Ireland)	Steve Staunton	LB	47	35	4	2	0	2	0	4	0	43	4
5	18	(Trinidad and Tobago)	Dwight Yorke	CF	43	33	4	2	0	4	0	0	0	39	4
6	11	(Republic of Ireland)	Andy Townsend	CM	40	32	0	2	0	2	0	4	0	40	0
7	13	(Australia)	Mark Bosnich	GK	34	30	0	1	0	3	0	0	0	34	0
8	2	(England)	Earl Barrett	RB	34	24	1	2	0	3	0	4	0	33	1
9	4	(England)	Shaun Teale	CB	32	28	0	2	0	2	0	0	0	32	0
10	7	(Republic of Ireland)	Ray Houghton	CM	32	19	7	0	0	2	0	3	1	24	8
11	17	(England)	Ian Taylor	CM	24	22	0	2	0	0	0	0	0	24	0
12	6	(England)	Kevin Richardson	CM	23	18	1	0	0	0	0	4	0	22	1
13	15	(England)	Phil King	LB	23	13	3	0	0	3	0	4	0	20	3
14	10	(England)	Dalian Atkinson	CF	21	11	5	0	0	2	0	3	0	16	5
15	14	(England)	Garry Parker	CM	20	12	2	0	0	4	0	0	2	16	4
16	25	(England)	Graham Fenton	AM	20	7	10	0	0	1	2	0	0	8	12
17	1	(England)	Nigel Spink	GK	18	12	1	1	0	0	0	4	0	17	1
18	22*	(England)	Gary Charles	RB	16	14	2	0	0	0	0	0	0	14	2
19	8	(England)	John Fashanu	CF	16	11	2	2	0	0	0	1	0	14	2
20	25	(England)	Tommy Johnson	CF	15	11	3	0	1	0	0	0	0	11	4
21	22	(England)	Guy Whittingham	CF	12	4	3	0	0	2	1	1	1	7	5
22	12	(Ghana)	Nii Lamptey	AM	9	1	5	0	0	2	1	0	0	3	6
23	2*	(England)	Alan Wright	LB	8	8	0	0	0	0	0	0	0	8	0
24	20	(England)	Bryan Small	LB	5	5	0	0	0	0	0	0	0	5	0
25	21	(England)	David Farrell	CM	2	0	0	0	0	2	0	0	0	2	0
26	14*	(England)	Franz Carr	RW	2	0	2	0	0	0	0	0	0	0	2
27	30	(England)	Michael Oakes	GK	1	0	0	0	0	1	0	0	0	1	0
28	24	(England)	Chris Boden	CB	1	0	1	0	0	0	0	0	0	0	1

=== Goals Involvements ===
Rank	#	Nat	Player	Pos	Apps	Goal Inv.	Premier League		FA Cup		League Cup		UEFA Cup		Total	
Rank	#	Nat	Player	Pos	Apps	Goal Inv.	Goals	Assists	Goals	Assists	Goals	Assists	Goals	Assists	Goals	Assists
1	9	(Wales)	Dean Saunders	CF	48	20	15	3	1	0	1	0	0	0	17	3
2	18	(Trinidad and Tobago)	Dwight Yorke	CF	43	14	6	5	1	0	1	1	0	0	8	6
3	3	(Republic of Ireland)	Steve Staunton	LB	47	12	5	7	0	0	0	0	0	0	5	7
4	10	(England)	Dalian Atkinson	CF	21	9	3	2	0	0	3	0	1	0	7	2
5	11	(Republic of Ireland)	Andy Townsend	CM	40	7	1	3	0	2	1	0	0	0	2	5
6	25	(England)	Tommy Johnson	CF	15	4	4	0	0	0	0	0	0	0	4	0
7	-	-	Own Goal	-	-	4	4	0	0	0	0	0	0	0	4	0
8	16	(England)	Ugo Ehiogu	CB	48	4	3	0	0	0	0	0	1	0	4	0
9	22	(England)	Guy Whittingham	CF	12	4	2	1	0	0	1	0	0	0	3	1
10	19	(England)	Graham Fenton	AM	20	4	2	1	0	0	0	1	0	0	2	2
11	7	(Republic of Ireland)	Ray Houghton	CM	32	4	1	2	0	0	0	1	0	0	2	2
12	17	(England)	Ian Taylor	CM	24	4	1	3	0	0	0	0	0	0	1	3
13	8	(England)	John Fashanu	CF	16	3	3	0	0	0	0	0	0	0	3	1
14	14	(England)	Garry Parker	CM	20	3	1	2	0	0	0	0	0	0	1	2
15	12	(Ghana)	Nii Lamptey	AM	9	3	0	0	0	0	3	0	0	0	3	0
16	4	(England)	Shaun Teale	CB	32	3	0	3	0	0	0	0	0	0	0	3
17	2	(England)	Earl Barrett	RB	34	1	0	1	0	0	0	0	0	0	0	1
18	22*	(England)	Gary Charles	RB	16	1	0	1	0	0	0	0	0	0	0	1
19	15	(England)	Phil King	LB	23	1	0	1	0	0	0	0	0	0	0	1
20	6	(England)	Kevin Richardson	CM	23	1	0	1	0	0	0	0	0	0	0	1

=== Clean Sheets ===
Rank	#	Nat	Player	Apps	Conceded	Clean Sheets	Premier League		FA Cup		League Cup		UEFA Cup	
Rank	#	Nat	Player	Apps	Conceded	Clean Sheets	Con	CS	Con	CS	Con	CS	Con	CS
1	13	(Australia)	Mark Bosnich	34	49	8	44	6	1	0	4	2	0	0
2	1	(England)	Nigel Spink	18	13	8	10	6	0	1	0	0	3	1
3	30	(England)	Michael Oakes	1	0	1	0	0	0	0	0	1	0	0

== Honours & Awards ==
Award	Recipient
Manager of the Month (Jan 1995)	Brian Little

== See also ==
- List of Aston Villa F.C. records and statistics
