= 1995–96 Aston Villa F.C. season =

English football club season

Aston Villa F.C.
1995–96 season
- Chairman: Doug Ellis
- Manager: Brian Little
- Stadium: Villa Park
- FA Premier League: 4th
- FA Cup: Semi-finals
- League Cup: Winners
- Top goalscorer: League: Dwight Yorke (17); All: Dwight Yorke (25)
- Highest home attendance: 39,336 vs Manchester City (27 April 1996, FAPremier League)
- Lowest home attendance: 17,679 vs Stockport County (25 October 1995, League Cup)
- Average home league attendance: 31,688
Home colours	Away colours

The 1995–96 English football season was Aston Villa's 4th season in the Premier League. The season was Aston Villa's 121st professional season, their 85th season in the top flight and their 8th consecutive season in the top tier of English football (the fourth in the FA Premier League).

Villa made huge progress in their first full season under Brian Little's management. He had arrived at Villa Park in November 1994, taking charge of a side faced with a real threat of relegation just 18 months after almost winning the Premier League title. The rebuilding process had started almost immediately, with Little quickly discarding the likes of Kevin Richardson, Garry Parker, Earl Barrett and Ray Houghton, and bringing in Ian Taylor, Gary Charles, Alan Wright and Tommy Johnson as mid-season signings. The rebuilding process had continued over the summer of 1995, with Shaun Teale, Dalian Atkinson and even top scorer Dean Saunders heading out of the Villa Park exit door, in favour of new signings including Gareth Southgate and Serbian striker Savo Milosevic - who both broke the club's transfer record in quick succession.

Villa finished fourth in the league and matched Liverpool's record of five League Cup victories (Liverpool have since reclaimed the record with victories in 2001, 2003 and 2012) thanks to a 3–0 Wembley win over Leeds United in March. Villa were also FA Cup semi-finalists, but their hopes of a Wembley double were ended with a defeat to Liverpool.

A new-look Villa side proved itself to be in fine form, thanks to the likes of Gary Charles, Alan Wright, Ian Taylor, and Mark Draper. Trinidadian striker Dwight Yorke established himself as one of the Premier League's most prolific goalscorers, though there were still some doubts regarding the suitability of Savo Milošević as the man to replace Dean Saunders. Roberto Carlos almost signed for Aston Villa in 1995 following the Umbro Cup match between Sweden and Brazil at Villa Park. The Aston Villa chairman, Doug Ellis was so impressed with his performance that he brought him to the boardroom and mutually agreeable terms were reached. However, manager Brian Little was not so keen on the player and,. instead, he moved to Inter Milan.

The club's longest-serving player, veteran goalkeeper Nigel Spink (361), left Villa halfway through the season after nearly 20 years to sign for local rivals West Bromwich Albion in Division One.

After the season ended, Little paid a club record £4million for Serbian midfielder Saša Ćurčić. With Gary Charles facing a long stretch on the sidelines with a serious ankle injury picked up during the final weeks of the season, Little signed Portuguese right-back Fernando Nelson.

Kit Supplier	Sponsor
<< Reebok >>	AST Computer

== FA Premier League ==
Pos	Team	Pld	W	D	L	GF	GA	GD	Pts	Qualification or relegation
2	Newcastle United	38	24	6	8	66	37	+29	78	Qualification for the UEFA Cup first round
3	Liverpool	38	20	11	7	70	34	+36	71	Qualification for the Cup Winners' Cup first round (Note: Liverpool qualified for the Cup Winners' Cup as FA Cup runners-up, as winners Manchester United already qualified for the Champions League. They defaulted their UEFA Cup spot from league position to Arsenal.)
4	Aston Villa	38	18	9	11	52	35	+17	63	Qualification for the UEFA Cup first round
5	Arsenal	38	17	12	9	49	32	+17	63	Qualification for the UEFA Cup first round
6	Everton	38	17	10	11	64	44	+20	61	Excluded from the UEFA Cup (Note: The Football Association was initially awarded a UEFA Fair Play berth to the Premier League's highest-placed team not qualified for Europe, but was revoked by UEFA for its clubs fielding under-strength sides in the 1995 UEFA Intertoto Cup.)

Source: Premier League
Rules for classification: 1) points; 2) goal difference; 3) number of goals scored.
Notes:

Matches

19 August 1995 1	Aston Villa	3-1	Manchester United	Birmingham
15:00	Taylor 14'; Draper 27'; Yorke 37' (pen.)	Report	Beckham 84'	Stadium: Villa Park; Attendance: 34,655; Referee: Robbie Hart

23 August 1995 2	Tottenham Hotspur	0-1	Aston Villa	London
19:45		Report	Ehiogu 69'	Stadium: White Hart Lane; Attendance: 26,726; Referee: Stephen Dunn

26 August 1995 3	Leeds United	2-0	Aston Villa	Leeds
15:00	Speed 3'; White 88'	Report		Stadium: Elland Road; Attendance: 35,086; Referee: Dermot Gallagher

30 August 1995 4	Aston Villa	1-0	Bolton Wanderers	Birmingham
19:45	Yorke 75'	Report		Stadium: Villa Park; Attendance: 31,770; Referee: Peter Jones

9 September 1995 5	Blackburn Rovers	1-1	Aston Villa	Blackburn
15:00	Shearer 52'	Report	Milošević 32'	Stadium: Ewood Park; Attendance: 27,084; Referee: Roger Dilkes

16 September 1995 6	Aston Villa	2-0	Wimbledon	Birmingham
15:00	Draper 7'; Taylor 47'	Report		Stadium: Villa Park; Attendance: 29,928; Referee: David Elleray

23 September 1995 7	Aston Villa	1-1	Nottingham Forest	Birmingham
15:00	Townsend 68'	Report	Lyttle 87'	Stadium: Villa Park; Attendance: 33,972; Referee: Paul Danson

30 September 1995 8	Coventry City	0-3	Aston Villa	Coventry
15:00		Report	Yorke 1'; Milošević 84' 87'	Stadium: Highfield Road; Attendance: 20,987; Referee: Alan Wilkie

14 October 1995 9	Aston Villa	0-1	Chelsea	Birmingham
15:00		Report	Wise 72'	Stadium: Villa Park; Attendance: 34,922; Referee: Stephen Dunn

21 October 1995 10	Arsenal	2-0	Aston Villa	London
15:00	Merson 47'; Wright 78'	Report		Stadium: Highbury; Attendance: 38,271; Referee: Robbie Hart

28 October 1995 11	Aston Villa	1-0	Everton	Birmingham
15:00	Yorke 76'	Report		Stadium: Villa Park; Attendance: 32,792; Referee: Keith Burge

4 November 1995 12	West Ham United	1-4	Aston Villa	London
15:00	Dicks 85' (pen.)	Report	Milošević 34' 89'; Johnson 49'; Yorke 55'	Stadium: Boleyn Ground; Attendance: 23,637; Referee: Peter Jones

18 November 1995 13	Aston Villa	1-1	Newcastle United	Birmingham
15:00	Johnson 22'	Report	Ferdinand 58'	Stadium: Villa Park; Attendance: 39,167; Referee: Stephen Lodge

20 November 1995 14	Southampton	0-1	Aston Villa	Southampton
20:00		Report	Johnson 30'	Stadium: The Dell; Attendance: 13,582; Referee: David Elleray

25 November 1995 15	Manchester City	1-0	Aston Villa	Manchester
15:00	Kinkladze 85'	Report		Stadium: Maine Road; Attendance: 28,027; Referee: Gerald Ashby

2 December 1995 16	Aston Villa	1-1	Arsenal	Birmingham
15:00	Yorke 65'	Report	Platt 60'	Stadium: Villa Park; Attendance: 37,770; Referee: Jeff Winter

10 December 1995 17	Nottingham Forest	1-1	Aston Villa	West Bridgford
16:00	Stone 82'	Report	Yorke 47'	Stadium: City Ground; Attendance: 25,790; Referee: Paul Durkin

16 December 1995 18	Aston Villa	4-1	Coventry City	Birmingham
15:00	Johnson 12'; Milošević 48' 63' 80'	Report	Dublin 54'	Stadium: Villa Park; Attendance: 28,486; Referee: Paul Alcock

23 December 1995 19	Queens Park Rangers	1-0	Aston Villa	London
15:00	Goallen 54'	Report		Stadium: Loftus Road; Attendance: 14,778; Referee: Alan Wilkie

1 January 1996 20	Middlesbrough	0-2	Aston Villa	Middlesbrough
18:00		Report	Wright 22'; Johnson 40'	Stadium: Riverside Stadium; Attendance: 28,535; Referee: Martin Bodenham

13 January 1996 21	Manchester United	0-0	Aston Villa	Greater Manchester
15:00		Report		Stadium: Old Trafford; Attendance: 42,667; Referee: Gary Wiillard

21 January 1996 22	Aston Villa	2-1	Tottenham Hotspur	Birmingham
16:00	McGrath 23'; Yorke 79'	Report	Fox 26'	Stadium: Villa Park; Attendance: 35,666; Referee: Graham Poll

31 January 1996 23	Aston Villa	0-2	Liverpool	Birmingham
19:45		Report	Collymore 61'; Fowler 65'	Stadium: Villa Park; Attendance: 39,332; Referee: Roger Dilkes

3 February 1996 24	Aston Villa	3-0	Leeds United	Birmingham
15:00	Yorke 11' 23'; Wright 62'	Report		Stadium: Villa Park; Attendance: 35,982; Referee: Robbie Hart

10 February 1996 25	Bolton Wanderers	0-2	Aston Villa	Bolton
15:00		Report	Yorke 40' 53'	Stadium: Burnden Park; Attendance: 18,099; Referee: Gerald Ashby

24 February 1996 26	Wimbledon	3-3	Aston Villa	London
15:00	Goodman 10' 47'; Harford 90'	Report	Reeves 30' (o.g.); Yorke 48' (pen.); Cunningham 57' (o.g.)	Stadium: Selhurst Park; Attendance: 12,193; Referee: Jeff Winter

28 February 1996 27	Aston Villa	2-0	Blackburn Rovers	Birmingham
19:45	Joachim 55'; Southgate 71'	Report		Stadium: Villa Park; Attendance: 28,008; Referee: Stephen Lodge

3 March 1996 28	Liverpool	3-0	Aston Villa	Liverpool
16:00	McManaman 2'; Fowler 5' 8'	Report		Stadium: Anfield; Attendance: 39,508; Referee: Keith Cooper

6 March 1996 29	Aston Villa	3-2	Sheffield Wednesday	Birmingham
19:45	Milošević 61' 62'; Townsend 75'	Report	Blinker 8' 63'	Stadium: Villa Park; Attendance: 27,893; Referee: David Elleray

9 March 1996 30	Aston Villa	4-2	Queens Park Rangers	Birmingham
15:00	Milošević 18'; Yorke 65' 80'; Yates 82'	Report	Dichio 50'; Gallen 59'	Stadium: Villa Park; Attendance: 28,221; Referee: Alan Wilkie

16 March 1996 31	Sheffield Wednesday	2-0	Aston Villa	Sheffield
15:00	Whittingham 58'; Hirst 87'	Report		Stadium: Hillsborough; Attendance: 22,964; Referee: Peter Jones

19 March 1996 32	Aston Villa	0-0	Middlesbrough	Birmingham
19:45		Report		Stadium: Villa Park; Attendance: 23,933; Referee: Paul Alcock

6 April 1996 33	Chelsea	1-2	Aston Villa	London
15:00	Spencer 6'	Report	Milošević 39'; Yorke 59'	Stadium: Stamford Bridge; Attendance: 23,530; Referee: Graham Poll

8 April 1996 34	Aston Villa	3-0	Southampton	Birmingham
15:00	Taylor 64'; Charles 78'; Yorke 82'	Report		Stadium: Villa Park; Attendance: 34,059; Referee: Paul Danson

14 April 1996 35	Newcastle United	1-0	Aston Villa	Newcastle upon Tyne
16:00	Ferdinand 64'	Report		Stadium: St. James' Park; Attendance: 36,510; Referee: Martin Bodenham

17 April 1996 36	Aston Villa	1-1	West Ham United	Birmingham
19:45	McGrath 27'	Report	Cottee 85'	Stadium: Villa Park; Attendance: 26,768; Referee: Stephen Dunn

27 April 1996 37	Aston Villa	0-1	Manchester City	Birmingham
15:00		Report	Lomas 70'	Stadium: Villa Park; Attendance: 39,336; Referee: David Elleray

5 May 1996 38	Everton	1-0	Aston Villa	Liverpool
16:00	Parkinson 78'	Report		Stadium: Goodison Park; Attendance: 40,127; Referee: Robbie Hart

Results by round

Match	1	2	3	4	5	6	7	8	9	10	11	12	13	14	15	16	17	18	19	20	21	22	23	24	25	26	27	28	29	30	31	32	33	34	35	36	37	38
Ground	H	A	A	H	A	H	H	A	H	A	H	A	H	A	A	H	A	H	A	A	A	H	H	H	A	A	H	A	H	H	A	H	A	H	A	H	H	A
Result	W	W	L	W	D	W	D	W	L	L	W	W	D	W	L	D	D	W	L	W	D	W	L	W	W	D	W	L	W	W	L	D	W	W	L	D	L	L
Position	2	3	6	5	5	3	5	2	6	7	7	5	4	3	4	4	6	4	6	5	7	5	6	4	4	4	4	4	4	4	4	4	4	4	4	4	4	4

Source: Statto.com
A = Away; H = Home; W = Win; D = Draw; L = Loss

== FA Cup ==
6 January 1996 R3	Aston Villa	3-0	Gravesend & Northfleet	Birmingham
15:00	Draper 2'; Milošević 47'; Johnson 72'			Stadium: Villa Park; Attendance: 26,021

28 January 1996 R4	Sheffield United	0-1	Aston Villa	Sheffield
15:00			Yorke 63' (pen.)	Stadium: Bramall Lane; Attendance: 18,749; Referee: Alan Wilkie

17 February 1996 R5	Ipswich Town	1-3	Aston Villa	Ipswich
15:00	Mason 83'		Draper 10'; Yorke 19'; Taylor 53'	Stadium: Portman Road; Attendance: 20,748; Referee: Stephen Lodge

13 March 1996 QF	Nottingham Forest	0-1	Aston Villa	West Bridgford
19:45			Carr 26'	Stadium: City Ground; Attendance: 21,067; Referee: Martin Bodenham

31 March 1996 SF	Aston Villa	0-3	Liverpool	Greater Manchester
16:00			Fowler 16' 86'; McAteer 90'	Stadium: Old Trafford; Attendance: 39,021; Referee: Paul Durkin

== League Cup ==
20 September 1995 R2 L1	Aston Villa	6-0	Peterborough United	Birmingham
19:45	Draper 12'; Yorke 15' (pen.) 42' (pen.); Heald 81' (o.g.); Southgate 89'			Stadium: Villa Park; Attendance: 19,602; Referee: Terry Hellbron

3 October 1995 R2 L2	Peterborough United	1-1 (1-7 agg.)	Aston Villa	Peterborough
19:45	Martindale 39'		Staunton 87'	Stadium: London Road; Attendance: 5,745; Referee: Gerald Ashby

25 October 1995 R3	Aston Villa	2-0	Stockport County	Birmingham
19:45	Ehiogu 57'; Yorke 65'			Stadium: Villa Park; Attendance: 17,679

29 November 1995 R4	Aston Villa	1-0	Queens Park Rangers	Birmingham
19:45	Townsend 60'			Stadium: Villa Park; Attendance: 24,951; Referee: Robbie Hart

10 January 1996 QF	Aston Villa	1-0	Wolverhampton Wanderers	Birmingham
19:45	Johnson 68'			Stadium: Villa Park; Attendance: 39,277; Referee: Martin Bodenham

14 February 1996 SF L1	Arsenal	2-2	Aston Villa	London
19:45	Bergkamp 26' 37'		Yorke 39' 72'	Stadium: Highbury; Attendance: 37,562; Referee: Paul Durkin

21 February 1996 SF L2	Aston Villa	0-0 (*2-2 agg.)	Arsenal	Birmingham
19:45				Stadium: Villa Park; Attendance: 39,334; Referee: Keith Burge

24 March 1996 FINAL	Aston Villa	3-0	Leeds United	London
17:00	Milošević 20'; Taylor 55'; Yorke 88'	1996 Football League Cup final		Stadium: Wembley; Attendance: 77,056; Referee: Robbie Hart

== Players ==
#	Name	Position	Nationality	Place of birth	Date of birth (age)	Signed from	Date signed	Fee	Apps	Gls
Goalkeepers
1	Mark Bosnich	GK	(Australia)	Liverpool	13 January 1972 (aged 23)	(Australia) Sydney Croatia	28 February 1992	Free transfer	94	0
13	Nigel Spink	GK	(England)	Chelmsford	8 August 1958 (aged 36)	Chelmsford City	4 January 1977	£4,000	450	0
30	Michael Oakes	GK	(England)	Northwich	30 October 1973 (aged 21)	Academy	1 July 1991	—N/a	1	0
35	Adam Rachel	GK	(England)	Birmingham	30 December 1976 (aged 18)	Academy	1 July 1995	—N/a	-	-
Defenders
2	Gary Charles	RB	(England)	Newham	13 April 1970 (aged 25)	Derby County	6 January 1995	£1,450,000	16	0
3	Steve Staunton	LB	(Republic of Ireland)	Dundalk	19 January 1969 (aged 26)	Liverpool	7 August 1991	£1,100,000	173	12
4	Gareth Southgate	CB	(England)	Watford	3 September 1970 (aged 24)	Crystal Palace	1 July 1995	£3,500,000	-	-
5	Paul McGrath	CB	(Republic of Ireland)	(England) Greenford	4 December 1959 (aged 35)	Manchester United	3 August 1989	£400,000	268	8
6	Carl Tiler	CB	(England)	Sheffield	11 February 1970 (aged 25)	Nottingham Forest	28 October 1995	£750,000	-	-
12	Phil King	LB	(England)	Bristol	28 December 1967 (aged 27)	Sheffield Wednesday	1 August 1994	£200,000	23	0
14	Alan Wright	LB	(England)	Ashton-under-Lyne	28 September 1971 (aged 23)	Blackburn Rovers	10 March 1995	£1,000,000	8	0
16	Ugo Ehiogu	CB	(England)	Hackney	3 November 1972 (aged 22)	West Bromwich Albion	12 July 1991	£40,000	81	4
20	Riccardo Scimeca	CB	(England)	Leamington Spa	13 June 1975 (aged 20)	Academy	1 July 1995	—N/a	-	-
21	Paul Browne	CB	(Scotland)	Glasgow	17 February 1976 (aged 19)	Academy	1 July 1995	—N/a	-	-
—N/a	Bryan Small	LB	(England)	Birmingham	15 November 1971 (aged 23)	Academy	1 July 1990	—N/a	43	0
Midfielders
7	Ian Taylor	CM	(England)	Birmingham	4 June 1968 (aged 27)	Sheffield Wednesday	21 December 1994	£1,000,000	24	1
8	Mark Draper	CM	(England)	Long Eaton	11 November 1970 (aged 24)	(England) Leicester City	5 July 1995	£3,250,000	-	-
11	Andy Townsend (c)	CM	(Republic of Ireland)	(England) Maidstone	26 July 1963 (aged 31)	Chelsea	26 July 1993	£2,100,000	87	6
15	Graham Fenton	AM	(England)	Whitley Bay	22 May 1974 (aged 21)	Academy	1 July 1993	—N/a	34	3
15*	Lee Hendrie	RM	(England)	Solihull	18 May 1977 (aged 18)	Academy	1 July 1995	—N/a	-	-
19	Gareth Farrelly	LM	(Republic of Ireland)	Dublin	28 August 1975 (aged 19)	Academy	1 July 1995	—N/a	-	-
22	David Farrell	CM	(England)	Birmingham	11 November 1971 (aged 23)	Redditch United	6 January 1992	£45,000	8	0
24	Scott Murray	RM	(Scotland)	Fraserburgh	26 May 1974 (aged 21)	Academy	1 July 1995	—N/a	-	-
Forwards
9	Savo Milošević	CF	(Federal Republic of Yugoslavia)	Bijeljina	2 September 1973 (aged 21)	(Federal Republic of Yugoslavia) Partizan	26 June 1995	£3,500,000	-	-
10	Tommy Johnson	CF	(England)	Gateshead	15 January 1971 (aged 24)	Derby County	6 January 1995	£1,450,000	15	4
17	Franz Carr	RW	(England)	Preston	24 September 1966 (aged 28)	(England) Leicester City	10 February 1995	£250,000	2	0
18	Dwight Yorke	CF	(Trinidad and Tobago)	Canaan	3 November 1971 (aged 23)	(Trinidad and Tobago) Signal Hill	19 July 1991	£120,000	146	37
23	Neil Davis	CF	(England)	Bloxwich	15 August 1973 (aged 21)	Academy	1 July 1995	—N/a	-	-
26	Julian Joachim	CF	(England)	Peterborough	20 September 1974 (aged 20)	Leicester City	24 February 1996	£1,890,000	-	-

*squad number was re-used following a players departure.
Note: Stats and ages are correct as of July 1, 1995.

=== Transfers ===
Transferred in

Date	Pos	Player	From	Fee
26 June 1995	CF	(Federal Republic of Yugoslavia) Savo Milošević	(Federal Republic of Yugoslavia) Partizan	£3,500,000
1 July 1995	CB	Gareth Southgate	Crystal Palace	£2,500,000
5 July 1995	CM	Mark Draper	Leicester City	£3,250,000
28 October 1995	CB	Carl Tiler	Nottingham Forest	£750,000
24 February 1996	CF	Julian Joachim	Leicester City	£1,890,000
				£11,890,000

Record

Loaned in

Date	Pos	Player	From	Loan End

Transferred out

Date	Pos	Player	To	Fee
1 July 1995	CF	John Fashanu	Retired	—N/a
1 July 1995	CF	(Wales) Dean Saunders	(Turkey) Galatasaray	£2,350,000
31 July 1995	AM	(Ghana) Nii Lamptey	Coventry City	£150,000
1 August 1995	CF	Dalian Atkinson	(Turkey) Fenerbahçe	£1,600,000
14 August 1995	CB	Shaun Teale	Tranmere Rovers	£450,000
14 September 1995	CM	David Farrell	Wycombe Wanderers	£100,000
13 October 1995	CM	Trevor Berry	Wycombe Wanderers	£100,000
6 November 1995	AM	Graham Fenton	Blackburn Rovers	£1,500,000
30 January 1996	GK	Nigel Spink	West Bromwich Albion	Free transfer
1 March 1996	LB	Bryan Small	Bolton Wanderers	Free transfer
21 March 1996	CF	Steve Cowe	Swindon Town	£100,000
				£6,350,000

Loaned out

Date	Pos	Player	To	Loan End

Overall transfer activity

Expenditure
▼£11,890,000

Income
▲£6,350,000

Balance
▼£5,540,000

=== Statistics ===
Appearances

Rank	#	Nat	Player	Pos	Apps	FA Premier League		FA Cup		League Cup		Total	
Rank	#	Nat	Player	Pos	Apps	XI	Sub	XI	Sub	XI	Sub	XI	Sub
1	1	(Australia)	Mark Bosnich	GK	51	38	0	5	0	8	0	51	0
2	14	(England)	Alan Wright	LB	51	38	0	5	0	8	0	51	0
3	16	(England)	Ugo Ehiogu	CB	50	37	0	5	0	8	0	50	0
4	8	(England)	Mark Draper	CM	49	36	0	5	0	8	0	49	0
5	9	(Federal Republic of Yugoslavia)	Savo Milošević	CF	49	36	1	5	0	7	0	48	1
6	18	(Trinidad and Tobago)	Dwight Yorke	CF	48	36	0	4	0	8	0	48	0
7	2	(England)	Gary Charles	RB	47	34	0	5	0	8	0	47	0
8	11	(Republic of Ireland)	Andy Townsend	CM	44	29	2	5	0	8	0	42	2
9	4	(England)	Gareth Southgate	CB	43	32	0	4	0	7	0	43	0
10	5	(Republic of Ireland)	Paul McGrath	CB	41	29	1	4	1	5	1	38	3
11	7	(England)	Ian Taylor	CM	35	23	2	4	0	5	1	32	3
12	10	(England)	Tommy Johnson	CF	31	18	7	2	0	4	0	24	7
13	20	(England)	Riccardo Scimeca	CB	22	8	6	1	2	1	4	10	12
14	3	(Republic of Ireland)	Steve Staunton	LB	17	9	3	1	0	2	2	12	5
15	26	(England)	Julian Joachim	CF	11	3	4	2	0	1	1	6	5
16	19	(Republic of Ireland)	Gareth Farrelly	LM	6	1	2	1	0	2	0	4	2
17	15	(England)	Graham Fenton	AM	5	3	0	0	0	2	0	5	0
18	23	(England)	Neil Davis	CF	3	3	0	0	0	0	0	3	0
19	15*	(England)	Lee Hendrie	RM	3	1	2	0	0	0	0	1	2
20	24	(Scotland)	Scott Murray	RM	3	0	3	0	0	0	0	0	3
21	13	(England)	Nigel Spink	GK	2	2	0	0	0	0	0	2	0
22	17	(England)	Franz Carr	RW	2	0	2	0	0	0	0	0	2
23	21	(Scotland)	Paul Browne	CB	2	0	2	0	0	0	0	0	2
24	6	(England)	Carl Tiler	CB	1	0	1	0	0	0	0	0	1

Goals Involvements

Rank	#	Nat	Player	Pos	Apps	Goal Inv.	FA Premier League		FA Cup		League Cup		Total	
Rank	#	Nat	Player	Pos	Apps	Goal Inv.	Goals	Assists	Goals	Assists	Goals	Assists	Goals	Assists
1	18	(Trinidad and Tobago)	Dwight Yorke	CF	48	36	17	10	2	1	6	0	25	11
2	9	(Federal Republic of Yugoslavia)	Savo Milošević	CF	49	23	12	6	1	1	1	2	14	9
3	10	(England)	Tommy Johnson	CF	31	10	6	2	1	0	1	0	8	2
4	7	(England)	Ian Taylor	CM	35	7	3	2	1	0	1	0	5	2
5	8	(England)	Mark Draper	CM	49	13	2	6	2	1	1	1	5	8
6	-	-	Own Goal	-	-	4	3	0	0	0	1	0	4	0
7	11	(Republic of Ireland)	Andy Townsend	CM	44	12	2	6	0	1	1	2	3	9
8	5	(Republic of Ireland)	Paul McGrath	CB	41	2	2	0	0	0	0	0	2	0
9	4	(England)	Gareth Southgate	CB	43	2	1	0	0	0	1	0	2	0
10	16	(England)	Ugo Ehiogu	CB	50	2	1	0	0	0	1	0	2	0
11	14	(England)	Alan Wright	LB	51	4	2	1	0	0	0	1	2	2
12	26	(England)	Julian Joachim	CF	11	1	1	0	0	0	0	0	1	0
13	17	(England)	Franz Carr	RW	2	1	0	0	1	0	0	0	1	0
14	2	(England)	Gary Charles	RB	47	8	1	6	0	0	0	1	1	7
15	3	(Republic of Ireland)	Steve Staunton	LB	17	2	0	0	0	1	1	0	1	1

Clean Sheets

Rank	#	Nat	Player	Apps	Conceded	Clean Sheets	FA Premier League		FA Cup		League Cup	
Rank	#	Nat	Player	Apps	Conceded	Clean Sheets	Con	CS	Con	CS	Con	CS
1	1	(Australia)	Mark Bosnich	51	42	22	32	14	4	3	6	5
2	13	(England)	Nigel Spink	2	0	2	0	2	0	0	0	0
