= Paul McGrath (footballer) =

Irish footballer

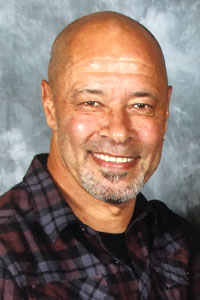
- McGrath in 2018

Personal information
- Full name: Paul McGrath
- Date of birth: 4 December 1959 (age 66)
- Place of birth: Greenford, England
- Height: 1.85 m (6 ft 1 in)
- Position: Centre back

Youth career
- 1971–1976: Pearse Rovers
- 1976–1981: Dalkey United

Senior career*
Years	Team	Apps	(Gls)
1981–1982	St Patrick's Athletic	26	(4)
1982–1989	Manchester United	163	(12)
1989–1996	Aston Villa	253	(9)
1996–1997	Derby County	24	(0)
1997–1998	Sheffield United	12	(0)
Total		478	(25)

International career
1985–1997	Republic of Ireland	83	(8)
- * Club domestic league appearances and goals

Paul McGrath (born 4 December 1959) is an Irish former professional footballer, who played as a defender. Regarded as one of the greatest centre-backs in modern football and one of Ireland's greatest ever footballers, McGrath was known for his tackling ability, determination, composure and reading of the game, and was known by the nickname "The Black Pearl" at Manchester United. He was also known by the nickname "God" at Aston Villa.

Mainly a centre back, McGrath also played as a defensive midfielder. He spent the majority of his career at Aston Villa and Manchester United (seven seasons apiece). As of August 2025, he is one of only six defenders to have won the PFA Players' Player of the Year award. He also played for St Patrick's Athletic, Derby County and Sheffield United.

A long-time member of the Republic of Ireland national team, McGrath appeared at the 1990 and 1994 FIFA World Cups, as well as UEFA Euro 1988, the team's first-ever international tournament.

== Early life ==
Paul McGrath was born on 4 December 1959 in Greenford, Middlesex, to a Nigerian father who met his Irish mother during his medical studies in Dublin. His father disappeared soon after his conception. His mother, Betty McGrath, was terrified that her father would find out she had become pregnant outside marriage and in an interracial relationship. She travelled in secret to London to have her child, who was considered illegitimate. Betty spent the last few weeks of her pregnancy in Acton at a Mother and Baby home, where she was pressured to give up her son for adoption. Although she resisted, Paul was forcibly taken away from her upon her arrival back in Dublin, where he was placed with a foster family and later transferred to the Smyly Trust Home. This was arranged and carried out by members of the Catholic Crusade in Dublin. McGrath was between four and ten weeks old when he entered the foster care system.

When he was five years old, one of the daughters of the family he had been fostered by came to Betty to say they could not control him. At that stage, his mother had him back for a number of days before having to put him into an orphanage. Despite being Paul McGrath on his birth certificate, the admission form required the name of the father, hence he was known as Paul Nwobilo for a time.

Betty would later have a second black child, a daughter named Okune, and both Betty and Okune would visit Paul while he was in care. Regretting giving Paul into care, Betty kept Okune with her, but growing up, this caused confusion within Paul who also wanted to live with her.

In school, McGrath had begun to excel in sports and was invited to play for Pearse Rovers Under-13s in Sallynoggin. McGrath remained in various forms of foster care around Dublin until he turned 18. In his later teenage years, he was able to reconcile with his mother, as well as his maternal grandfather.

By age 17, McGrath had begun playing for the junior football club Dalkey United. However, within months of leaving foster care he suffered a "catastrophic mental breakdown" that would ultimately last for a year. McGrath was placed in the psychiatric hospital St. John of God in Stillorgan, where he lay in a "trance-like state, unspeaking, incontinent and covered in bedsores". Doctors informed McGrath's mother that he might never walk again. McGrath was eventually able to recover from his episode and resume his sporting career.

== Club career ==
=== St Patrick's Athletic ===
McGrath signed his first professional contract at St Patrick's Athletic aged 21. He made his debut on 30 August 1981 in a League of Ireland Cup clash against Shamrock Rovers at Richmond Park. In the game's match programme, manager Charlie Walker stated in his notes that

"Since the end of last season I have been acquiring new players: three are local lads from junior clubs — Billy Reid (Fatima Rangers), Paul McGrath (Dalkey United) and John Cleary (Ballyfermot United). Given time and a little encouragement I feel that by the end of the season they will have done the club proud."

Although his League Cup debut ended in a 2–3 defeat, McGrath scored the winner in his next game, a Leinster Senior Cup match against Shelbourne.

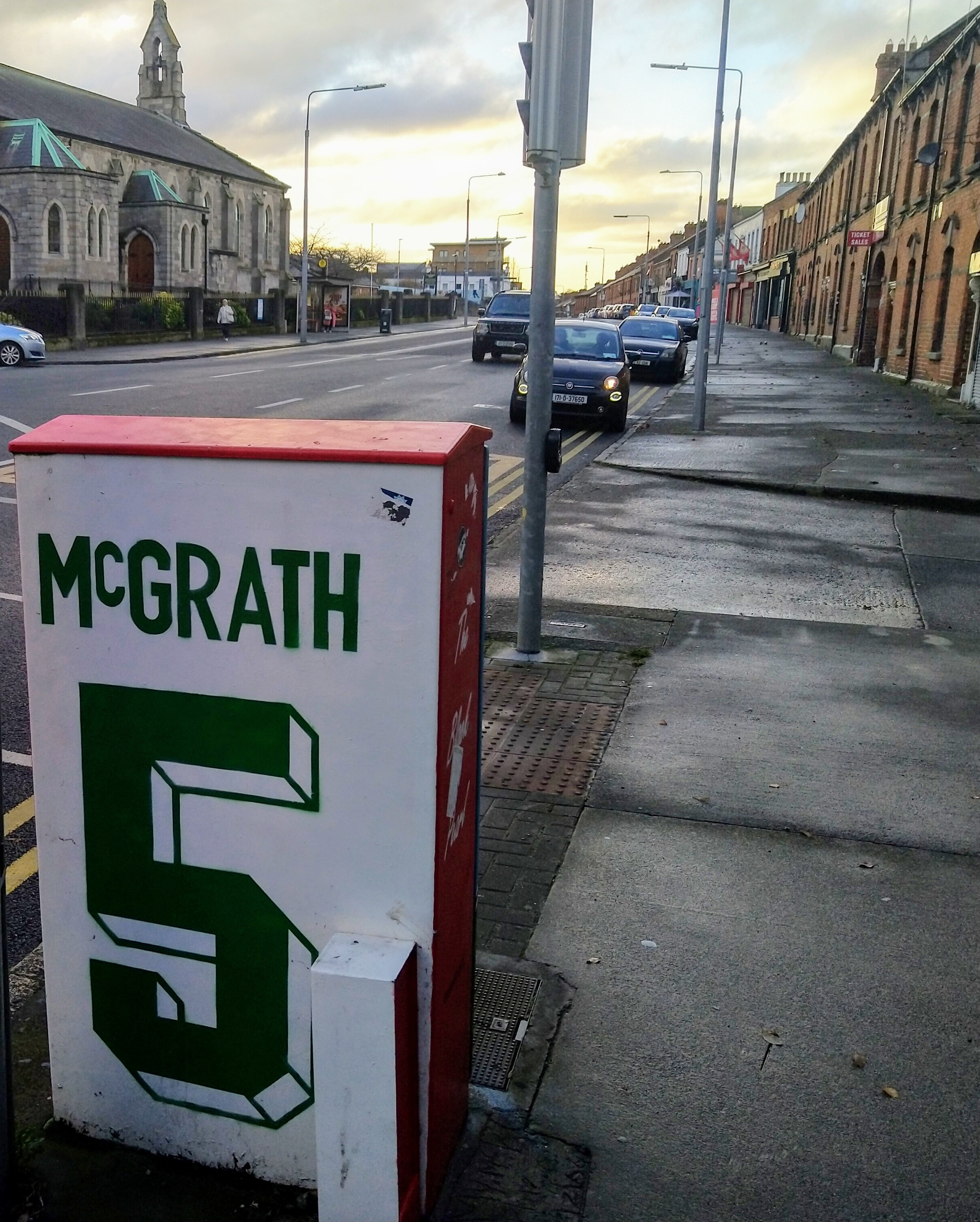
Street art dedicated to McGrath outside Richmond Park, home ground of his first club St Patrick's Athletic.

He ultimately excelled at The Saints, earning the nickname "The Black Pearl of Inchicore" and winning the PFAI Players' Player of the Year award for 1982. His performances attracted the attention of Billy Behan and Manchester United, who brought McGrath over for a trial in April 1982.

=== Manchester United ===
On 27 April 1982, after completing his trial, a deal was agreed with St. Pat's and McGrath signed for Manchester United. The club's manager at the time was Ron Atkinson, who McGrath later described as one of his "favourite men in football". McGrath joined a cohort of Irish players at United and credited Kevin Moran, Frank Stapleton, Ashley Grimes and Anthony Whelan with helping him to settle in. After an operation on his cartilage in the summer, he made his debut for United on 10 November 1982 against Bradford City in the League Cup. McGrath scored his first goal for United against Luton Town on 9 May 1983 at Old Trafford. However, he missed out on a place in the team's 1983 FA Cup victory over Brighton & Hove Albion later that month.

McGrath eventually ousted Gordon McQueen to become the regular partner to Kevin Moran in the centre of defence. The highlight of his Manchester United career came in the 1985 FA Cup final, where a 1–0 win over Everton secured the trophy and McGrath picked up the Man of the Match award.

In 1985–86, it appeared that McGrath was on course to pick up a league title medal after United won their first 10 league games of the season, but injuries to key players including Bryan Robson soon took their toll on the side and they managed only nine wins from their remaining 27 games. The team eventually finished fourth in the table, 12 points behind champions Liverpool. Their poor form continued into the 1986–87 season and, after United's worst start in 14 years, Ron Atkinson was sacked and replaced by Alex Ferguson in November 1986, but McGrath initially remained a regular member of the first team. United finished second behind Liverpool in the league a year later.

By the 1988–89 season, McGrath was struggling with knee injuries and was becoming a less regular member of the first team, facing competition from new signings Steve Bruce and Mal Donaghy. His relationship with manager Ferguson had also become strained and United offered McGrath a pay deal to retire rather than sell him to another club. However, then aged only 29, McGrath decided to continue playing. During this period, McGrath was offered terms at S.S.C. Napoli, but the deal did not come to fruition.

=== Aston Villa ===
McGrath signed for Aston Villa in August 1989. While at Villa, McGrath played some of the best football of his career, despite recurrent problems in his knees. Villa had narrowly avoided relegation the previous season, yet came close to winning the title in McGrath's first season. With McGrath operating in a three-man defence alongside Derek Mountfield and Kent Nielsen, Villa finished second in the league to Liverpool.

The next season saw the club fighting relegation for much of the campaign after boss Graham Taylor left to take control of England. Taylor had been replaced by Jozef Vengloš, the first top-flight manager to hail from the European mainland. Despite the managerial upheaval, McGrath's performances continued to impress and he became a consistent mainstay in the Aston Villa lineup.

When Vengloš resigned from Villa after a solitary season with the club, McGrath was reunited with Ron Atkinson who took over as manager and built a squad that managed a seventh-place finish. In the inaugural season of the Premier League, Aston Villa once again finished as runners-up, this time behind Manchester United. As a sign of the regard he was now held in by his fellow professionals, McGrath won the 1992–93 PFA Players' Player of the Year award. He added further silverware in 1994, winning his first trophy with Villa as they lifted the League Cup, beating Manchester United 3–1 in the final. In November 1994, Atkinson was dismissed following a poor start to the season that left Villa in the relegation places. The 1995–96 season saw McGrath enter the final year of his Aston Villa contract. The campaign ended in success when McGrath won the League Cup with Villa again, this time overcoming Leeds United 3–0. McGrath was rewarded for his performances with a contract extension, which he signed in May 1996.

Despite spending the previous season as a regular in a back three alongside Gareth Southgate and Ugo Ehiogu, McGrath found himself out of the starting lineup for the start of the 1996–97 campaign. Instead, McGrath's international teammate Steve Staunton was preferred by manager Brian Little. Aged 36 and wishing to maximise his playing time, McGrath submitted a transfer request and an offer of £200,000 from newly promoted Derby County was accepted by Aston Villa.

=== Derby County ===
McGrath joined Derby in October 1996 and, despite being unable to train due to severe knee pain, went straight into the starting line-up against Newcastle United. In January 1997, before and after a 3–1 home win against Aston Villa in the FA Cup, the travelling Villa fans sang McGrath's name. When Derby County achieved a 3–2 away win to McGrath's old club Manchester United in April 1997, Alex Ferguson credited McGrath with a man-of-the-match display. Another victory against Villa on 12 April 1997 meant Derby secured their Premier League status with four games to play. In a post-match press conference, with half of McGrath's fee due to Villa upon avoiding relegation, manager Jim Smith said he was "delighted to cough up the money" and labeled McGrath's performance as "tremendous". By the end of the season, McGrath had helped Derby to a 12th-place finish in the Premier League. However, McGrath's injury problems had worsened as the season came to a close and Derby decided not to offer him a new contract.

=== Later career ===
After his release by Derby County, McGrath dropped down a division to sign for Sheffield United in July 1997. He made his debut for the club on 10 August 1997 against Sunderland, a 2–0 victory at Bramall Lane. He played his final game as a professional for Sheffield United against Ipswich Town on 9 November 1997, just before his 38th birthday. After a minor operation on his knees, McGrath was back in training with the club in January 1998 but by February he was struggling to return to fitness. McGrath officially announced his retirement from football on 17 April 1998.

== International career ==
McGrath made his debut for the Republic of Ireland in a friendly against Italy on 5 February 1985.

In November 1989, McGrath was part of the Republic of Ireland team that qualified for the country's first FIFA World Cup. The tournament, hosted by Italy, was held in 1990. The Republic of Ireland reached the quarter-finals, where they lost 1–0 to the hosts in Rome, with McGrath ever present in the lineups (five matches, 480 minutes played). He received the Irish International Player of the Year award in both 1990 and 1991 in recognition of his contributions to the side and captained the team four times in 1992 after the retirement of Mick McCarthy.

McGrath started in the Republic of Ireland's Euro 92 qualifier against England at Wembley in 1991.

In the Republic of Ireland's opening game of the 1994 World Cup – a 1–0 win against favourites Italy, thanks to Ray Houghton's early goal – McGrath put up an astonishing defensive performance despite suffering through a shoulder injury, including blocking a shot from Roberto Baggio with his face.

When McGrath announced his retirement on 17 April 1998, he did so as Ireland's most-capped player and having served as his country's first black captain.

== Style of play and legacy ==
Praised frequently for his physicality, tackling, determination and reading of the game, McGrath has been described as one of the greatest centre-backs of the modern era, one of the best defenders in Premier League history and one of Ireland's greatest ever players. He was given the nickname "the Black Pearl of Inchicore" while at St Patrick's Athletic, and Manchester United fans dubbed McGrath "the Black Pearl" during his time at the club. Aston Villa fans referred to McGrath by the nickname "God"; at Aston Villa games, fans often still chant "Paul McGrath, My Lord", a song for McGrath to the tune of Kumbaya in reference to this nickname.

=== In popular culture ===
British author Lee Child is a fan of Aston Villa; in his second book in the Jack Reacher series, Die Trying (1998), the naming of the fictional characters, FBI agents Paul "Mack" McGrath and Milosevic are hidden references to players McGrath and Savo Milošević.

== Post-professional football life ==
McGrath suffers from alcoholism and missed occasional matches as a result. In an interview with FourFourTwo, he admitted to playing football while still under the influence of alcohol; additionally, his recurrent knee problems resulted in him undergoing a total of eight operations during his career. McGrath's autobiography, Back from the Brink, co-written with journalist Vincent Hogan, was the inaugural winner of the William Hill Irish Sports Book of the Year (2006).

Upon retiring, he settled in Monageer, County Wexford. In 2004, one year after being taken to court, charged with a breach of the peace, McGrath returned to the football world after five years, moving to Waterford United in Ireland as director of football.

In 2011, McGrath recorded a cover version of the Gerry Goffin and Carole King song "Goin' Back". He followed that single up with an 11-track album released in 2011 with profits going to his two designated charities the Acquired Brain Injury Foundation and the Cystic Fibrosis Foundation of Ireland.

On 29 June 2013, McGrath was arrested over an alleged public order offence at a hotel in County Offaly. He was bailed and appeared at Tullamore district court on 17 July.

== Personal life ==
Paul's half-sister Okune McGrath died in March 1994 due to complications stemming from a lifelong rare blood disorder. Their mother Betty McGrath-Lowth died 4 September 2020, aged 83.

As a result of the trauma of his early life and his subsequent alcoholism, McGrath has openly discussed through his autobiography and through interviews that he suffered at least four major suicide attempts in his life. One attempt came in November 1989 after Manchester United sold him to Aston Villa. McGrath would return to play for Aston Villa on 5 November 1989, in a 6–2 victory over Everton, but during the game had to hide wounds to his wrists using wristbands.

Until he got his drinking under control in the 2010s, the precariousness of McGrath's long-term mental health impacted his family life; McGrath has been divorced twice. In 2019, McGrath claimed to have been roughly functional since 2014, although admitted to still occasionally consuming alcohol.

McGrath is the father of five sons and a daughter, and, as of 2019, has five grandchildren.

== Career statistics ==
=== Club ===
Appearances and goals by club, season and competition
Club	Season	League			FA Cup		League Cup (Note: Includes League of Ireland Cup & EFL Cup)		Other		Total	
Club	Season	Division	Apps	Goals	Apps	Goals	Apps	Goals	Apps	Goals	Apps	Goals
St Patrick's Athletic	1981–82	League of Ireland	26	4	3	0	3	1	-		32	5
Manchester United	1982–83	First Division	14	3	1	0	1	0	—		16	3
Manchester United	1983–84	First Division	9	1	0	0	1	0	2 (Note: Appearances in European Cup Winners' Cup)	0	12	1
Manchester United	1984–85	First Division	23	0	7	2	0	0	2 (Note: Appearance(s) in UEFA Cup)	0	32	2
Manchester United	1985–86	First Division	40	3	4	0	4	1	1 (Note: Appearance in FA Charity Shield)	0	49	4
Manchester United	1986–87	First Division	35	2	1	0	4	0	—		40	2
Manchester United	1987–88	First Division	22	2	0	0	2	1	—		24	3
Manchester United	1988–89	First Division	20	1	5	0	1	0	—		26	1
Manchester United	Total		163	12	18	2	13	2	5	0	199	16
Aston Villa	1989–90	First Division	35	1	5	0	3	0	—		43	1
Aston Villa	1990–91	First Division	35	0	2	0	4	0	3	0	44	0
Aston Villa	1991–92	First Division	41	1	5	0	2	0	—		48	1
Aston Villa	1992–93	Premier League	42	4	4	0	4	1	—		50	5
Aston Villa	1993–94	Premier League	30	1	2	0	8	0	4	0	44	1
Aston Villa	1994–95	Premier League	40	0	2	0	3	0	4	0	49	0
Aston Villa	1995–96	Premier League	30	2	5	0	6	0	-		40	2
Aston Villa	1996–97	Premier League	0	0	0	0	0	0	1	0	1	0
Aston Villa	Total		253	9	25	0	30	1	12	0	323	10
Derby County	1996–97	Premier League	24	0	2	0	0	0	-		26	0
Sheffield United	1997–98	First Division	12	0	0	0	2	0	-		14	0
Career total			478	25	47	2	59	4	16	0	598	31

=== International ===
Appearances and goals by national team and year
National team	Year	Apps	Goals
Republic of Ireland	1985	7	0
Republic of Ireland	1986	6	1
Republic of Ireland	1987	7	2
Republic of Ireland	1988	6	0
Republic of Ireland	1989	7	1
Republic of Ireland	1990	9	0
Republic of Ireland	1991	7	1
Republic of Ireland	1992	8	1
Republic of Ireland	1993	6	1
Republic of Ireland	1994	8	0
Republic of Ireland	1995	9	1
Republic of Ireland	1996	2	0
Republic of Ireland	1997	1	0
Total		83	8

== Honours ==
Manchester United

- FA Cup: 1984–85

Aston Villa

- Football League Cup: 1993–94, 1995–96

Individual

- PFAI Players' Player of the Year: 1982
- PFA Team of the Year: 1985–86 First Division, 1992–93 Premier League
- Ballon d'Or nominee: 1987, 1990, 1991, 1993
- Aston Villa Player of the Season: 1989–90, 1990–91, 1991–92, 1992–93
- FAI Senior International Player of the Year: 1990, 1991
- PFA Players' Player of the Year: 1993
- Football League 100 Legends: 1998 (inducted)
- English Football Hall of Fame: 2015 (inducted)
- FAI Hall of Fame: 2020 (inducted)

== See also ==
- List of people on the postage stamps of Ireland
- List of Republic of Ireland international footballers born outside the Republic of Ireland
