= Ugo Ehiogu =

English football player and coach (1972–2017)

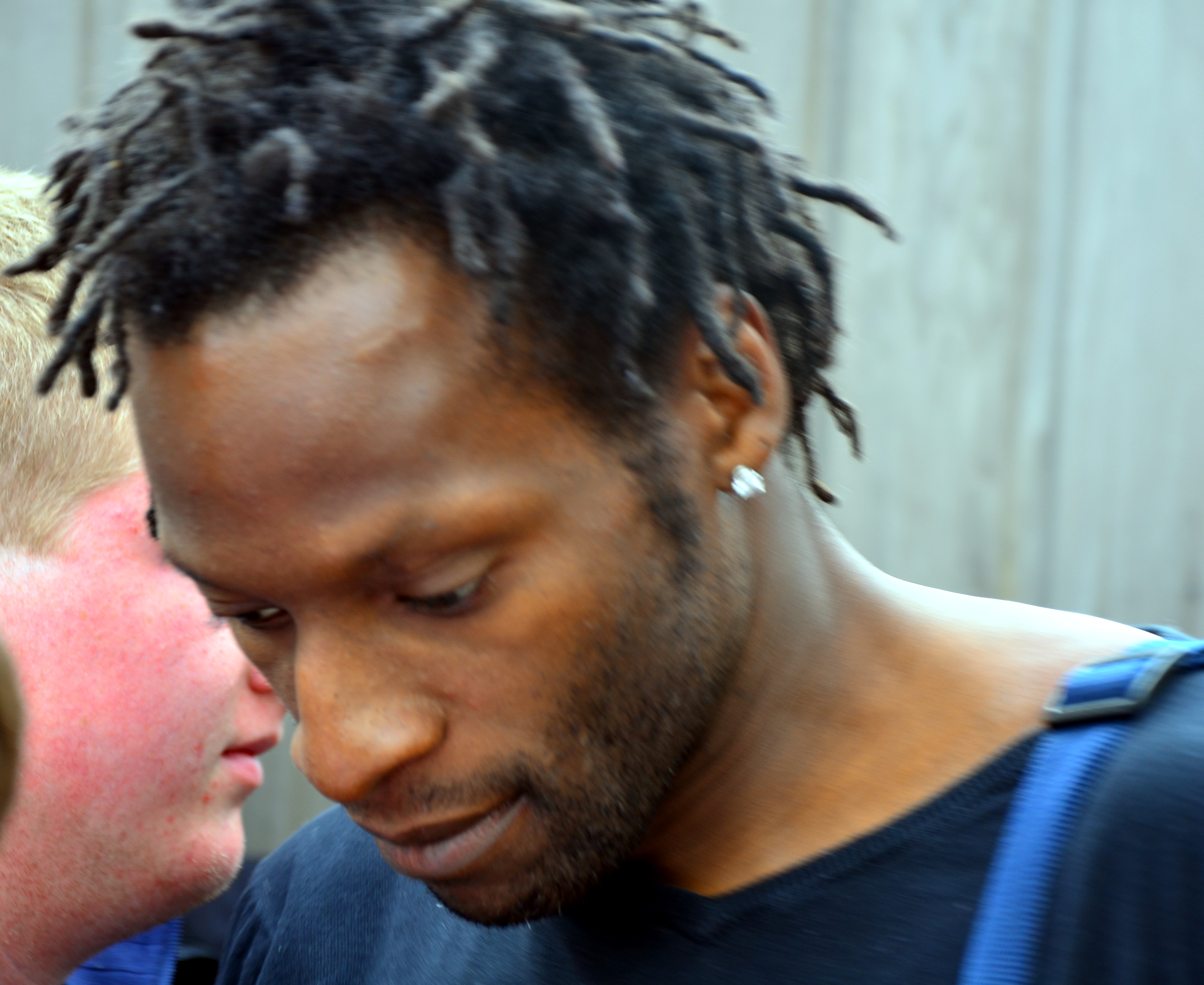
- Ehiogu in 2013

Personal information
- Full name: Ugochukwu Ehiogu
- Date of birth: 3 November 1972
- Place of birth: Hackney, London, England
- Date of death: 21 April 2017 (aged 44)
- Place of death: Edmonton, London, England
- Height: 6 ft 2 in (1.88 m)
- Position: Centre-back

Youth career
- –: Senrab
- –1989: West Bromwich Albion

Senior career*
Years	Team	Apps	(Gls)
1989–1991	West Bromwich Albion	2	(0)
1991–2000	Aston Villa	237	(12)
2000–2007	Middlesbrough	126	(7)
2006–2007	→ Leeds United (loan)	6	(1)
2007–2008	Rangers	9	(1)
2008–2009	Sheffield United	26	(1)
2012	Wembley	0	(0)
Total		406	(22)

International career
1992–1993	England U21	15	(1)
1994	England B	1	(0)
1996–2002	England	4	(1)

Managerial career
- 2014–2017: Tottenham Hotspur U21s
- * Club domestic league appearances and goals

Ugochukwu Ehiogu (/ˈɛhiɒɡ/; 3 November 1972 – 21 April 2017) was an English professional football coach and player who played as a centre-back. After retiring, he became a record executive, jointly founding the successful record label, Dirty Hit. Ehiogu was the head coach of the Tottenham Hotspur Under-21s from 2014 until his death in 2017.

He played in the Premier League with lengthy spells at Aston Villa and Middlesbrough. He also played in the Football League for West Bromwich Albion, Leeds United and Sheffield United, as well as a spell in the Scottish Premier League with Rangers. He won two Football League Cups, with Aston Villa in 1996 and then with Middlesbrough in 2004.

Ehiogu was an England international, with a record of 4 caps and 1 goal. In 1993, playing for the England Under-21s, he became the first black player to captain an England team in a competitive match.

Ehiogu died on 21 April 2017 after suffering a cardiac arrest at Tottenham's training ground. In February 2026, the U16 Ugo Ehiogu Memorial Cup was held by the Tottenham Hotspur Academy in his honour.

== Club career ==
=== Early life ===
Ehiogu was born in Hackney, London, into a family of Nigerian background. He began his career at West Bromwich Albion as a trainee, turning professional in 1989.

=== Aston Villa ===
After just a few games for Albion in the Second Division, Ron Atkinson brought him to First Division club Aston Villa for a £40,000 fee in August 1991. By 1994, he had replaced Shaun Teale as the main central defensive partner to Paul McGrath.

In the 1993–94 season Villa played Tranmere Rovers over two legs in the semi-finals of the League Cup, in which Ehiogu took part in the second leg. Ehiogu was selected as a substitute and came on to replace Ray Houghton during the game, helping the team to a 3–1 win leaving the two legs at 4–4 on aggregate. In the following penalty shoot-out he went on the take the fifth penalty, which he struck against the bar and missed. Ron Atkinson had told The Independent newspaper that it was "the most dramatic football match" of his managerial career. However, Villa went on to win the shootout for a League Cup final showdown with Manchester United, which Ehiogu missed out on.

In the 1994–95 season, Villa competed in the UEFA Cup, where in the second round second leg in a match against Turkish club Trabzonspor, Ehiogu scored in the 90th minute in a 2–1 home win. However, this wasn't enough as the tie ended 2–2 on aggregate, meaning Trabzonspor went through on the away goals rule.

He was part of the Villa team that won the 1995–96 Football League Cup, as Villa beat Leeds United 3–0 in the final. Ehiogu also received a runners-up medal when Villa lost 1–0 to Chelsea in the 2000 FA Cup Final.

He remained at the club for nine years, making over 300 appearances in all competitions until November 2000, when he joined Middlesbrough from Villa for, at the time, a club record fee of £8 million. The deal went ahead after negotiations between Villa and West Bromwich Albion, whose 50% sell-on clause on the player had been seen as a stumbling block to the move.

=== Middlesbrough ===
His career at Boro got off on the wrong foot when he was forced to limp off with a calf injury five minutes into his debut at Charlton Athletic. Whilst at Middlesbrough, Ehiogu quickly became a mainstay in the central defence since joining the club and rejoining his former teammate Gareth Southgate in central defence. He missed the start of the 2003–04 season with a knee injury sustained in the final match of the previous season. He returned in time to play in Boro's League Cup final win against Bolton Wanderers, the first major trophy in the club's history. Only into the third game at the start of 2004–05 season Ehiogu had an accidental clash with his own keeper Mark Schwarzer which resulted in knee ligament damage. Again he was forced to miss many important games, although Boro still managed to secure a place in the UEFA Cup for a second successive season.

He agreed a loan move to West Bromwich Albion during the January transfer window of 2006, but this move was cancelled when a number of Middlesbrough players became injured. West Brom then tried to secure a permanent transfer, but were unable to agree personal terms with Ehiogu.

On 23 November 2006, he moved to Leeds United on loan. He made six appearances and scored one goal against Barnsley and also an own goal against Stoke, during his spell at Leeds, which ended in January 2007 when his loan deal expired. After returning to Boro, he made one final appearance for the club.

=== Rangers ===
Ehiogu was released from his contract at Middlesbrough and signed an 18-month contract with Scottish Premier League club Rangers in January 2007. His first goal for Rangers came on 11 March with an overhead kick in his first Old Firm game, giving Rangers a 1–0 win against Celtic. The Rangers fans voted for Ehiogu's goal against Celtic as their Goal of the Season.

Ehiogu found his first team opportunities limited at the start of the 2007–08 season, with Carlos Cuéllar and David Weir being preferred by manager Walter Smith. He was released by Rangers that January.

=== Sheffield United ===
On 16 January 2008, it was reported that Sheffield United were interested in signing Ehiogu. The next day he was released by Rangers and travelled down to Sheffield for talks with club manager Bryan Robson. He completed the move on 18 January 2008. Ehiogu made his first team debut for the Blades in a 1–1 home draw with Watford at the end of January, and was used as a defensive cover for the remainder of the season.

With injuries and suspensions to his fellow defenders in the early stages of the following season he forced his way into the first team and was rewarded with what turned out to be his only goal in Blades colours, scoring the winner against Preston North End in October 2008. Having embarked on his most successful spell for United he suffered an injury in the Boxing Day game against Wolves which sidelined him for the rest of the season. After the Blades failed to gain promotion, Ehiogu was released at the end of the season when his contract expired as the club tried to cut costs.

On 3 August 2009, Ehiogu retired from football after a trial with Milton Keynes Dons.

=== Wembley ===
On 24 August 2012, Ehiogu came out of retirement to sign for Wembley, agreeing to play in the club's FA Cup games alongside fellow former professionals Ray Parlour, Martin Keown, Claudio Caniggia, Brian McBride and Graeme Le Saux. Ehiogu played alongside Caniggia in the club's 2–2 draw with Uxbridge in the preliminary round. Wembley subsequently lost the replay 5–0.

== International career ==
In April 1993, Ehiogu became the first black player to captain an England team in a competitive match, in a game for the England U21 team against the Netherlands. Ehiogu made his senior England debut on 23 May 1996, replacing Tony Adams after 76 minutes of a 3–0 friendly win against China at the Workers' Stadium in Beijing. He went on to win another three caps in friendly matches and scored once for his country, a header in a 3–0 victory over Spain on 28 February 2001 at Villa Park.

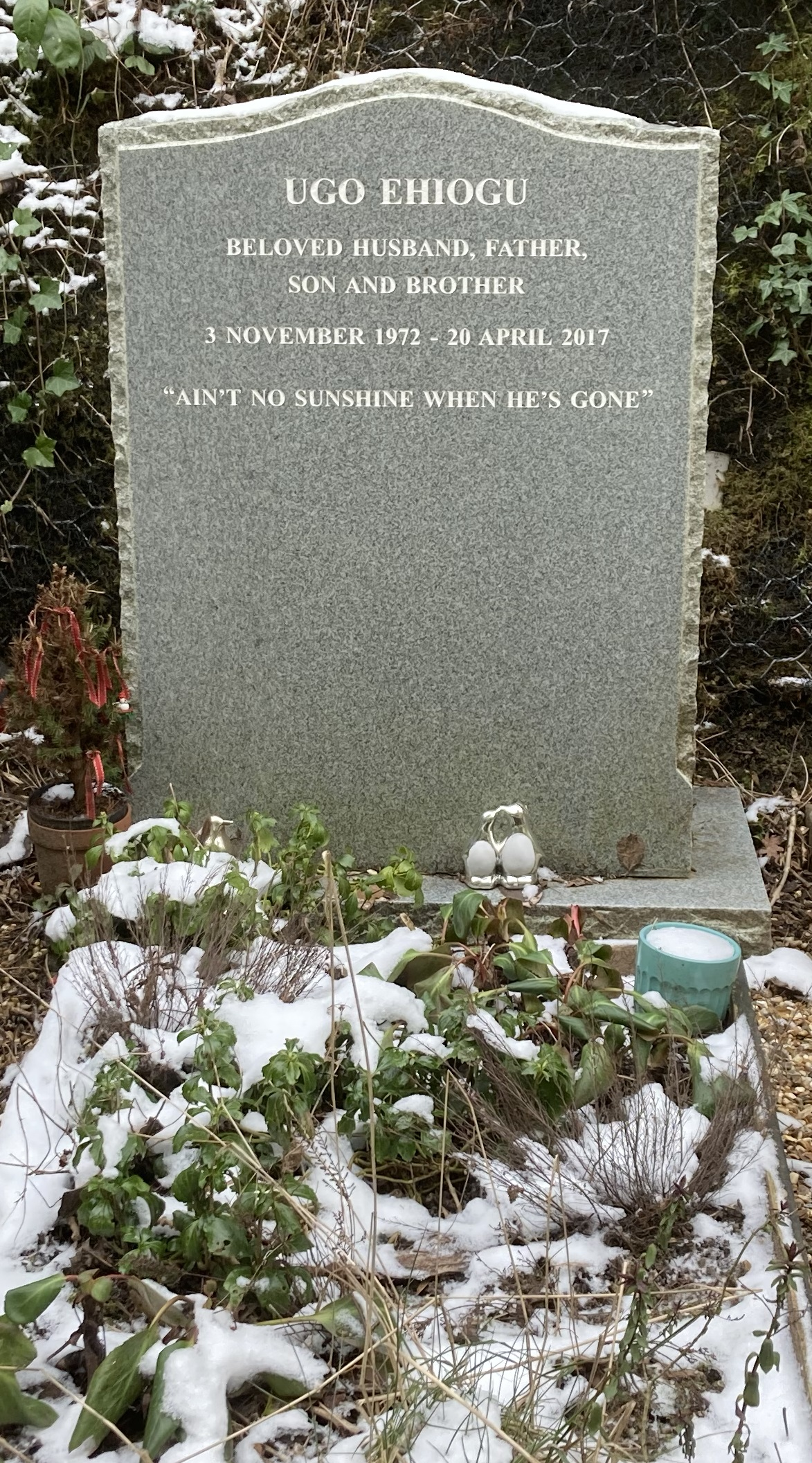
Grave of Ugo Ehiogu in Highgate Cemetery (west side)

== Coaching career ==
Ehiogu worked with the England Under-20s in 2013 and was part of Peter Taylor's coaching team at the 2013 FIFA U-20 World Cup.

Following a period working part-time with the Tottenham Hotspur Academy, Ehiogu was appointed Under-21s team coach in July 2014. Writing after he had suffered a heart attack, Henry Winter noted that Ehiogu "is one of the most thoughtful English coaches, frequently talking eloquently about the need for English football to have a more distinct culture and commit more to age-group tournaments so that senior internationals of the future can experience differing styles".

== Music career ==
After retirement, Ehiogu began working in music management. In 2010, he established a record label, Dirty Hit, with Jamie Oborne, Chuck Waite and Brian Smith. After signing The 1975 for £20, the band became Dirty Hit’s first act to achieve mainstream success. Other notable artists affiliated with the label include Wolf Alice, Beabadoobee and Pale Waves.

== Personal life ==
Ehiogu married Gemma Coleman in 2005. The couple had a son, Obi Jackson, together. Ehiogu also had a daughter Jodie from a previous relationship.

=== Death ===
On 20 April 2017, Ehiogu collapsed due to a cardiac arrest at the Tottenham Hotspur training ground and was taken to hospital, where he died early the next morning at the age of 44. He is buried in Highgate Cemetery.

=== Tributes ===
In the days following Ehiogu's death, many clubs held tributes to him in the form of a minute's applause before matches, in which players wore black armbands. In the aftermath, it was announced that Ehiogu's widow Gemma would set up a charity in his honour. She used social media site JustGiving with the aim of raising £1,000 to start the charity. By 24 April, the appeal had raised £11,000.

In February 2026, the Tottenham Hotspur Academy held the inaugural U16 Ugo Ehiogu Memorial Cup in his honour. The two-day youth tournament at Hotspur Way featured the Under-16s of Ehiogu's former clubs Aston Villa and Sheffield United, as well as Liverpool, Fulham, Charlton Athletic and Tottenham. Aston Villa and Sheffield United contested the final, with the former crowned as champions.

== Career statistics ==
=== Club ===
Appearances and goals by club, season and competition
Club	Season	League			National Cup (Note: Includes FA Cup)		League Cup (Note: Includes Football League Cup, Scottish League Cup)		Other		Total	
Club	Season	Division	Apps	Goals	Apps	Goals	Apps	Goals	Apps	Goals	Apps	Goals
West Bromwich Albion	1990–91	Second Division	2	0	0	0	0	0	0	0	2	0
Aston Villa	1991–92	First Division	8	0	1	0	0	0	1 (Note: Appearance in Full Members' Cup)	0	10	0
Aston Villa	1992–93	Premier League	4	0	0	0	1	0	—		5	0
Aston Villa	1993–94	Premier League	17	0	1	0	1	0	0	0	19	0
Aston Villa	1994–95	Premier League	39	3	2	0	3	0	4 (Note: Appearances in UEFA Cup)	1	48	4
Aston Villa	1995–96	Premier League	36	1	5	0	8	1	—		49	2
Aston Villa	1996–97	Premier League	38	3	3	1	2	0	2	0	45	4
Aston Villa	1997–98	Premier League	37	2	4	0	1	0	6	0	48	2
Aston Villa	1998–99	Premier League	25	2	2	0	1	0	3	0	31	2
Aston Villa	1999–2000	Premier League	31	1	6	0	7	0	—		44	1
Aston Villa	2000–01	Premier League	2	0	—		—		2 (Note: Appearances in UEFA Intertoto Cup)	0	4	0
Aston Villa	Total		237	12	24	1	24	1	18	1	303	15
Middlesbrough	2000–01	Premier League	21	3	3	0	0	0	—		24	3
Middlesbrough	2001–02	Premier League	29	1	2	1	2	0	—		33	2
Middlesbrough	2002–03	Premier League	32	3	0	0	0	0	—		32	3
Middlesbrough	2003–04	Premier League	16	0	1	0	2	0	—		19	0
Middlesbrough	2004–05	Premier League	10	0	1	0	1	0	0	0	12	0
Middlesbrough	2005–06	Premier League	18	0	3	0	2	0	7	0	30	0
Middlesbrough	2006–07	Premier League	0	0	1	0	0	0	—		1	0
Middlesbrough	Total		126	7	11	1	7	0	7	0	151	8
Leeds United (loan)	2006–07	Championship	6	1	—		—		—		6	1
Rangers	2006–07	Scottish Premier League	9	1	—		—		2	0	11	1
Rangers	2007–08	Scottish Premier League	0	0	—		1	0	0	0	1	0
Rangers	Total		9	1	—		1	0	2	0	12	1
Sheffield United	2007–08	Championship	10	0	—		—		—		10	0
Sheffield United	2008–09	Championship	16	1	0	0	1	0	0	0	17	1
Sheffield United	Total		26	1	0	0	1	0	0	0	27	1
Career total			406	22	35	2	33	1	27	1	501	26

=== International ===
Appearances and goals by national team and year
National team	Year	Apps	Goals
England	1996	1	0
England	2001	2	1
England	2002	1	0
Total		4	1

Scores and results list England's goal tally first, score column indicates score after Ehiogu goal.

International goal scored by Ugo Ehiogu
No.	Date	Venue	Cap	Opponent	Score	Result	Competition
1	28 February 2001	Villa Park, Birmingham, England	2	Spain	3–0	3–0	Friendly

== Honours ==
Aston Villa

- Football League Cup: 1995–96
- FA Cup runner-up: 1999–2000

Middlesbrough

- Football League Cup: 2003–04
- UEFA Cup runner-up: 2005–06

Individual

- PFA Team of the Year: 1995–96 Premier League
