= FIFA Two =

Footballers who fell afoul of transfer regulations

The FIFA Two refers to Colin Healy and Gareth Farrelly, two Irish international football players who were prevented from playing for Cork City as they had already played for two other clubs in the 2006-07 period. Some commentators noted a potential conflict between FIFA's ruling and European Union regulations prohibiting restrictions on a citizen’s right to work. After lobbying from Ireland's football governing body, the Football Association of Ireland, FIFA subsequently changed its transfer regulations in January 2008.

== Background ==
In April 2007, FIFA informed Cork City that they would not allow two players, Irish internationals Colin Healy and Gareth Farrelly, to play for the club. FIFA had ruled that, as the players had already played for two other clubs in the previous 12 months, neither player could play until the "summer transfer window" in July 2007.

In the related FIFA regulation, the Regulations for the Status and Transfer of Players, Chapter III: Registration of Players, Article 5.3, it stated that:

“Players may be registered for a maximum of three clubs during the period from 1 July until 30 June of the following year. During this period, the player is only eligible to play in Official Matches for two clubs.

As of June 2007, Healy and Farrelly had not yet debuted for Cork City due to the FIFA ruling, and had to wait until July 2007 to become eligible to play.

While the Court of Arbitration for Sport upheld the initial FIFA ruling, FIFA amended its transfer regulations in January 2008 to include an exception for leagues with overlapping seasons. In addressing the issue, FIFA added the following language to Article 5.3:

As an exception to this rule, a player moving between two clubs belonging to associations with overlapping seasons (i.e. start of the season in summer/autumn as opposed to winter/spring) may be eligible to play in official matches for a third club during the relevant season, provided he has fully complied with his contractual obligations towards his previous clubs. Equally, the provisions relating to the registration periods (article 6) as well as to the minimum length of a contract (article 18 paragraph 2) must be respected.

== Related precedents ==
The Finnish Football Association, an association that also has its season within a calendar year, similar to Ireland, permits any player who signs for a Finnish club, and in the same situation as Colin Healy or Gareth Farrelly, to play in official matches in Finland. According to a 2007 ESPN article, the Finnish FA allowed players in similar situations to Healy and Farrelly to play, a move the article characterised as disregarding FIFA's rule.

A number of sources compared the situation, with Healy and Farrelly, to the case of Javier Mascherano, an Argentine international who joined Liverpool after playing for West Ham United and Corinthians within the preceding five months.

Several players with other League of Ireland sides were also impacted by Article 5.3, but were subsequently cleared to play. One of these players was Shaun Holmes who, after an appeal, was given leave to play for Finn Harps in 2007.
