= Chris Boden =

English footballer

Personal information
- Full name: Christopher Desmond Boden
- Date of birth: 13 October 1973 (age 53)
- Place of birth: Wolverhampton, England
- Height: 5 ft 9 in (1.75 m)
- Position: Defender

Youth career
- Aston Villa

Senior career*
Years	Team	Apps	(Gls)
1991–1995	Aston Villa	1	(0)
1993	→ Barnsley (loan)	4	(0)
1995–1998	Derby County	10	(0)
1996	→ Shrewsbury Town (loan)	5	(0)
1998–1999	Hereford United	4	(0)
Total		24	(0)
- * Club domestic league appearances and goals

Chris Boden (born 13 October 1973) is an English former professional footballer.

Boden was a trainee at Aston Villa, where he made just one senior appearance. He also played for Barnsley, Derby County, Shrewsbury Town and Hereford United.

He retired from professional football after suffering a knee injury.
