= Franz Carr =

English footballer

Personal information
- Date of birth: 24 September 1966 (age 60)
- Place of birth: Preston, England
- Height: 5 ft 6 in (1.68 m)
- Positions: Forward; winger

Senior career*
Years	Team	Apps	(Gls)
1984	Blackburn Rovers	0	(0)
1984–1991	Nottingham Forest	131	(17)
1989	→ Sheffield Wednesday (loan)	12	(0)
1991	→ West Ham United (loan)	3	(0)
1991–1993	Newcastle United	25	(3)
1992	→ Sheffield United (loan)	8	(3)
1993–1994	Sheffield United	10	(1)
1994	→ Leicester City (loan)	5	(0)
1994–1995	Leicester City	8	(1)
1995–1996	Aston Villa	3	(0)
1996–1998	Reggiana	6	(0)
1997–1998	→ Bolton Wanderers (loan)	5	(0)
1998	West Bromwich Albion	4	(0)
1999–2000	Pittsburgh Riverhounds SC	0	(0)
Total		220	(25)

International career
1983–1984	England U17	13	(4)
1985	England U20	1	(0)
1986–1988	England U21	9	(1)
- * Club domestic league appearances and goals

Franz Carr (born 24 September 1966) is an English former professional footballer who played as a forward and winger from 1984 until 2000. He made 131 appearances in seven years with Nottingham Forest, and had shorter spells in the Premier League or Football League with Sheffield Wednesday, West Ham United, Newcastle United, Sheffield United, Leicester City, Aston Villa, Bolton Wanderers and West Bromwich Albion. He also spent time in Italy with Reggiana and in United States with Pittsburgh Riverhounds SC.

== Career ==
Carr began his career with Blackburn Rovers, but before making a first team appearance was signed for £25,000 rising to £100,000 by Nottingham Forest in August 1984.

After arriving at Forest, Carr was seen as a popular winger who, at his peak, was one of the fastest players off the mark. Mostly playing down the right wing, he was a regular target for midfielder Neil Webb and striker Nigel Clough to chip balls over the opposing left-back. He was exciting but lacked a good final ball, much to the ire of manager Brian Clough. Clough described Carr in typical idiosyncratic fashion as the best bloody corner flag hitter in the country, if only that was where the net was. Despite this, Carr still contributed to Forest's Football League Cup triumphs in 1989 and 1990.

However, he lost his place in the first team during the 1989–90 season, managing just 14 league appearances and one goal. He joined relegation strugglers Sheffield Wednesday on loan, making 12 goalless appearances in the First Division.

He featured 13 times for Forest in the 1990–91 season, scoring twice, though his part in their run to the FA Cup final (which they lost to Tottenham Hotspur) was minimal. He also had a loan spell with West Ham United, playing three times in their Second Division promotion campaign.

Carr transferred to Newcastle United on 13 June 1991 for £250,000, playing under Osvaldo Ardiles. He scored on his debut as part of a 2–1 loss away to Charlton Athletic, with his second goal coming against Plymouth Argyle in September. A knee injury forced him to miss the majority of the season, returning to play the final three games, at which point Kevin Keegan had taken charge. Carr moved to Sheffield United in January 1993 for about £150,000.

He continued to play in the Premier League with Sheffield United, Leicester City and Aston Villa. Despite only playing three league games in two seasons at Aston Villa, he scored the winning goal for them in their FA Cup quarter-final against his old club Nottingham Forest in the 1995–96 season, enabling them to reach the semi-finals in which they were beaten by Liverpool.

Carr began winding down his career with a move to Reggiana and short spells with Bolton Wanderers and West Bromwich Albion.

== Personal life ==
Carr now lives in Alfreton, Derbyshire.

== Career statistics ==
Appearances and goals by club, season and competition
Club	Season	League			FA Cup		League Cup		Other (Note: unsourced)		Total	
Club	Season	Division	Apps	Goals	Apps	Goals	Apps	Goals	Apps	Goals	Apps	Goals
Nottingham Forest	1985–86	First Division	23	3	0	0	2	1	0	0	25	4
Nottingham Forest	1986–87	First Division	36	4	0	0	6	3	1	0	43	7
Nottingham Forest	1987–88	First Division	22	4	0	0	3	1	0	0	25	5
Nottingham Forest	1988–89	First Division	23	3	4	0	6	0	2	1	35	4
Nottingham Forest	1989–90	First Division	14	1	0	0	1	0	1	0	16	1
Nottingham Forest	1990–91	First Division	13	2	0	0	0	0	1	0	14	2
Nottingham Forest	Total		131	17	4	0	18	5	5	1	158	23
Sheffield Wednesday (loan)	1989–90	First Division	12	0	2	0	0	0	0	0	14	0
West Ham United (loan)	1990–91	Second Division	3	0	0	0	0	0	0	0	3	0
Newcastle United	1991–92	Second Division	15	2	0	0	1	0	0	0	16	2
Newcastle United	1992–93	First Division	10	1	0	0	3	0	0	0	13	1
Newcastle United	Total		25	3	0	0	4	0	0	0	29	3
Sheffield United (loan)	1992–93	Premier League	8	3	4	0	0	0	0	0	12	3
Sheffield United	1993–94	Premier League	10	1	0	0	0	0	0	0	10	1
Leicester City (loan)	1994–95	Premier League	5	0	0	0	0	0	0	0	5	0
Leicester City	1994–95	Premier League	8	1	0	0	0	0	0	0	8	1
Aston Villa	1994–95	Premier League	2	0	0	0	0	0	0	0	2	0
Aston Villa	1995–96	Premier League	1	0	1	1	0	0	0	0	2	1
Aston Villa	Total		3	0	1	1	0	0	0	0	4	1
Reggiana	1996–97	Serie A	6	0	0	0	0	0	0	0	6	0
Bolton Wanderers (loan)	1997–98	Premier League	5	0	0	0	0	0	0	0	5	0
West Bromwich Albion	1997–98	First Division	4	0	0	0	0	0	0	0	4	0
Career total			220	25	11	1	22	5	5	1	258	32

== Honours ==
Nottingham Forest

- Football League Cup: 1989–90
- Full Members' Cup: 1988–89
- Football League Centenary Tournament: 1988
