= Paul Browne (footballer) =

Scottish footballer

Personal information
- Full name: Paul Gerard Browne
- Date of birth: 17 February 1976 (age 50)
- Place of birth: Glasgow, Scotland
- Position: Central defender

Youth career
- Aston Villa

Senior career*
Years	Team	Apps	(Gls)
1993–1996	Aston Villa	6	(0)
1996–2003	Raith Rovers	212	(6)
2002	→ Arbroath (loan)	19	(0)
2003	Nuneaton Borough 29 (3)		
2003	→ Hinckley United (loan) 22		
2003–2004	Arbroath	28	(1)

International career
1996	Scotland under-21	1	(0)
- * Club domestic league appearances and goals

Paul Gerard Browne (born 17 February 1976) is a Scottish retired footballer who played as a defender.

== Playing career ==
=== Aston Villa ===
Browne began his career in England with Premier League side Aston Villa, featuring in two league matches towards the end of the 1995–96 season.

=== Raith Rovers ===
Despite his two starts, Browne was sold to Scottish Premier Division side Raith Rovers in the summer of 1996 and made his debut for the Kirkcaldy side in a 1–0 defeat against Rangers. Featuring in a number of matches that season, Browne played the majority of the following season following Raith's relegation, scoring twice.

In the 1998–99 season, Browne suffered from ill discipline, receiving eleven bookings and one dismissal as Raith finished in eighth place, in a season which saw him fail to add to his two goals from the previous season.

Browne netted four goals in 1999–00, helping Raith to mid-table safety but the following season yielded no goals as Raith survived relegation by just three points.

In 2001–02, however, Raith finished bottom and were relegated to the Scottish Second Division.

Browne featured initially for Raith, playing in a Scottish League Challenge Cup match and league match, but was sent on loan to Arbroath for the remainder of 2002, featuring sixteen times.

=== Nuneaton Borough ===
After returning from loan at Arbroath, Browne spent the remainder of the season with Nuneaton Borough and Hinckley United on loan.

=== Arbroath ===
In 2003, Browne was accused of making a hoax call to Arbroath player Eddie Forrest, claiming to be the Chairman of Raith Rovers and offering a full-time contract. Forrest asked to be released from his contract with Arbroath, who then signed Browne as a replacement player. Browne claims a friend made the call, but Arbroath withdrew their contract as a result.

Whilst Forrest returned to Arbroath, he subsequently joined Partick Thistle, leaving a defensive gap. Arbroath manager John Brownlie forgave Browne and re-signed him on a one-year deal.

=== Junior Football ===
Following his season back at Arbroath, Browne moved into junior football with Lochore Welfare, where he was playing up to 2008 before joining St Andrews United. In May 2009, Browne helped St Andrews defeat former club Lochore to clinch promotion to the Scottish Junior Football East Region Premier League.

== Internationals ==
Browne was capped by Scotland under-21 during his time at Aston Villa.

== Management career ==
In March 2020, Browne became the under 20s manager for Kirkcaldy & Dysart F.C. In 2021 paul became the assistant manager-of dundonald bluebell first team
