= Neil Davis (footballer) =

English footballer

Personal information
- Date of birth: 15 August 1973 (age 53)
- Place of birth: Bloxwich, England
- Position: Striker

Team information
- Current team: Coleshill Town

Senior career*
Years	Team	Apps	(Gls)
1990–1991	Redditch United		
1991–1998	Aston Villa	2	(0)
1996–1997	→Tranmere Rovers (loan)	13	(0)
1997	→Wycombe Wanderers (loan)	0	(0)
1998	Walsall	1	(0)
1998–2002	Hednesford Town	58	(34)
2002–2003	Newport County	43	(13)
2003–????	Bromsgrove Rovers		
2010–????	Coleshill Town		
Total		117+	(47+)
- * Club domestic league appearances and goals

Neil Davis (born 15 August 1973) is an English former professional footballer who played for Midland Football Alliance side Coleshill Town as a striker.
