= Gareth Farrelly =

Irish footballer (born 1975)

Personal information
- Date of birth: 28 August 1975 (age 51)
- Place of birth: Dublin, Ireland
- Height: 1.83 m (6 ft 0 in)
- Position: Midfielder

Youth career
- Home Farm
- 1992–1995: Aston Villa

Senior career*
Years	Team	Apps	(Gls)
1995–1997	Aston Villa	8	(0)
1995	→ Rotherham United (loan)	10	(2)
1997–1999	Everton	27	(2)
1999–2004	Bolton Wanderers	78	(5)
2003	→ Rotherham United (loan)	6	(0)
2003	→ Burnley (loan)	12	(0)
2003–2004	→ Bradford City (loan)	14	(0)
2004	Wigan Athletic	7	(0)
2004–2006	Bohemians	41	(7)
2006–2007	Blackpool	1	(0)
2007–2008	Cork City	21	(2)
2009–2010	Morecambe	0	(0)
2010	Warrington Town	5	(0)
Total		230	(17)

International career
1996–2000	Republic of Ireland	6	(0)

Managerial career
- 2004–2006: Bohemians
- * Club domestic league appearances and goals

Gareth Farrelly (born 28 August 1975) is an Irish football manager and former professional footballer.

He played as a midfielder notably in the Premier League for Aston Villa, Bolton Wanderers and Everton. He also played in the Football League for Rotherham United, Burnley, Bradford City, Wigan Athletic, Blackpool and Morecambe, as well as in his native Ireland for Bohemians and Cork City and English non-league team Warrington Town. He also played six times for the Republic of Ireland.

== Club career ==
Born in Dublin, Farrelly played schoolboy football for Bohemians F.C. Aston Villa signed him as a 16-year-old in 1992, and he made his Villa debut on 20 September 1995 against Peterborough United.

Farrelly moved to Everton in July 1997 for approximately £700,000, and after a season where Everton, and Farrelly personally, struggled, he scored the goal (ironically with his weaker right foot after numerous wayward efforts with left foot throughout the season) that preserved their Premier League status on the final day of the 1997–98 season against Coventry City. Ironically, this goal also relegated his next club, Bolton Wanderers. He also scored once in the League Cup against Scunthorpe United. However, he was soon on the move to Bolton Wanderers, initially on loan. He won promotion back to the Premier League with Bolton in 2001, scoring the opening goal for them in the play-off final, but then fell out of favour. He was subsequently loaned out to Rotherham United, Burnley, Bradford City, and latterly Wigan Athletic.

Farrelly joined Bohemians in late August 2004 as player-manager, making his début as a late substitute in the 1–0 home win against Cork City on 17 September 2004.

He was sacked on 30 August 2006 following Bohemians' elimination from the FAI Cup at the hands of Shamrock Rovers, in which he missed a penalty late in the game.

Farrelly then underwent a trial with Leicester City. He left the Foxes after they ended their interest in him. On 24 November 2006, he joined Blackpool on a short-term contract, which expired in February 2007.

On 15 February 2007, he agreed to sign for Eircom League of Ireland Premier Division side Cork City on a two-year contract. Farrelly was however not allowed to play for Cork until 1 July 2007 as FIFA regulations at the time allowed players to play professionally for a maximum two clubs in the period between 1 July of one year and 20 June of the next (see FIFA Two for an explanation on this case and an ensuing amendment to the regulation in question:).

On 12 May 2008 Farrelly underwent a serious operation to remove a tumour from his pancreas. His manager Alan Matthews reported: "Gareth has had major surgery and remains in intensive care in Warwick hospital." The operation was an apparent success. Following his illness he had spells at Morecambe and Warrington. Farrelly settled a case against Cork City for unfair dismissal in October 2009.

== International career ==
Farrelly made his full international debut for Ireland as a 21-year-old, and has six caps.

== Personal life ==
Since retiring as a professional footballer, Gareth moved into a career in law. He undertook an LLB degree at Edge Hill University, before training as a solicitor in London. During his training he spent time on secondment in the legal team at Everton.

== Managerial statistics ==
Team	Nat	From	To	Record				
Team	Nat	From	To	G	W	L	D	Win %
Bohemians	Ireland	2004	2006	66	27	14	25	40.91

== Honours ==
Bolton Wanderers

- Football League First Division play-offs: 2001

Cork City

- FAI Cup: 2007
