= Phil King (footballer) =

English footballer

Personal information
- Full name: Philip Geoffrey King
- Date of birth: 28 December 1967 (age 58)
- Place of birth: Bristol, England
- Height: 5 ft 9 in (1.75 m)
- Position: Defender

Youth career
- –1985: Exeter City

Senior career*
Years	Team	Apps	(Gls)
1985–1986	Exeter City	27	(0)
1986–1987	Torquay United	24	(3)
1987–1989	Swindon Town	116	(4)
1989–1994	Sheffield Wednesday	129	(2)
1993	→ Notts County (loan)	6	(0)
1994–1997	Aston Villa	16	(0)
1995	→ West Bromwich Albion (loan)	5	(0)
1997–1999	Swindon Town	6	(0)
1997	→ Blackpool (loan)	16	(0)
1999	Brighton & Hove Albion	3	(0)
1999–2000	Kidderminster Harriers	14	(2)
2000–2001	Bath City	0	(0)
2004	Cinderford Town		

International career
1991	England B	1	(0)
- * Club domestic league appearances and goals

Philip Geoffrey King (born 28 December 1967) is an English former professional footballer and sports co-commentator for BBC Radio Wiltshire.

As a player he was a defender who notably played in the Premier League for both Sheffield Wednesday and Aston Villa. He also played in the Football League for Exeter City, Torquay United, Swindon Town, Notts County, West Bromwich Albion, Blackpool and Brighton & Hove Albion before finishing his career in Non-League football with Kidderminster Harriers, Bath City and Cinderford Town. He represented England at the under-21 level and in a B international.

== Playing career ==
Born in Bristol, King began his career as an apprentice with Exeter City, turning professional in January 1985, and making his league debut the same season. After 27 games for the Grecians, he moved to Torquay United in July 1986 for a fee of £3,000 instantly fitting in as a regular in Stuart Morgan's struggling side. However, in February 1987, after 24 league games in which he scored 3 times, he was sold to Swindon Town for £25,000 with United desperately short of players and with no money to spend, Mark Gardiner and Charlie Henry (on loan) coming in the opposite direction.

At Swindon, his career really took off, culminating in England Under-21 honours and a £400,000 move to Sheffield Wednesday in November 1989, after 116 games (four goals) for the Robins. He made his Owls' debut on 4 November and settled well into playing higher-level football, although Wednesday were relegated to Division Two at the end of the season. The following season, he played at Wembley in 1991, when Wednesday won the League Cup, beating Manchester United 1–0 in the final, and played his part in Wednesday's instant return to the top flight. After losing his place to Andy Sinton, King went to Notts County on loan in October 1993, and joined his former Wednesday manager Ron Atkinson at Aston Villa for a fee of £250,000 in August 1994.

After an impressive start to his Villa Park career, including scoring the winning penalty in a UEFA Cup tie against Inter Milan, he lost his place at left-back to Shaun Teale (normally a central defender) when Brian Little was appointed manager, and moved further out of the first team picture after the signing of Alan Wright from Blackburn Rovers. He joined West Bromwich Albion on loan in October 1995, but two months later suffered a serious cruciate ligament injury in the Baggies' game against Norwich City, which took him 17 months to recover from, and meant his knee would never be fully fit again.

He eventually returned to fitness and became a regular in Villa's reserve side until leaving in March 1997 to rejoin Swindon Town on a free transfer. However, he fell out with the manager Steve McMahon, and other than a loan spell at Blackpool and more time out with injuries, mainly just saw action on the training ground until a free transfer move to Brighton & Hove Albion in March 1999. He played only three times for the Seagulls, before being released at the end of the season.

He spent the following pre-season with Chester City and was offered a monthly contract, but instead decided to join Conference side Kidderminster Harriers in August 1999, helping them to the Conference title the following season. It appeared that King would return to the Football League with Kidderminster, but he moved to Bath City on a free transfer in July 2000, as he wanted to remain part-time while running The Dolphin pub in Swindon. Given his history of injuries and Bath's financial plight he signed a pay-as-you-play deal, but almost as soon as he had joined aggravated an old calf injury which kept him out of the team for four months. On 10 January 2001, he finally made his Bath debut in the Dr Martens Cup, a 5–0 defeat against Newport County at Spytty Park, but this was his only first team appearance, as the following month he picked up another knee injury, playing with his children in the garden. In April 2001 the Bath Chronicle reported that he was about to retire from football as tests on his knee injury had shown cartilage damage and early signs of arthritis.

In March 2004, King came out of retirement to play for Cinderford Town, answering an SOS call from manager Phil Mullen.

== Personal life ==
Although King is retired from football he still runs out for the Aston Villa side in the annual Masters Football Tournament and he is currently still involved with Swindon Town. King currently commentates on Swindon Town matches for BBC Radio Wiltshire.

He has been described as a "cult hero" for many Villa fans as a result of his famous winning penalty in the shootout against Inter Milan.

== Honours ==
Swindon Town

- Football League Third Division play-offs: 1987

Sheffield Wednesday

- Football League Cup: 1990–91; runner-up: 1992–93

Kidderminster Harriers

- Football Conference: 2000–01
