= Canaan, Tobago =

Canaan
- village
- Location within Trinidad and Tobago
- Coordinates: 11.150°N 60.817°W
- Country: Trinidad and Tobago
- Ward: Tobago

Population (2011)
  - Total: 2,120

Canaan is a small village in southwestern Tobago situated about 5 minutes (by car) from Arthur Napoleon Raymond Robinson International Airport (formerly Crown Point Airport), and the popular beaches of Store Bay and Pigeon Point. It is between the towns of Bon Accord and Lowlands. It boasts amenities such as one of the largest supermarkets in Tobago, a popular bakery, car dealership, and a noticeable number of other shops. Canaan is the birthplace of footballer Dwight Yorke.

Canaan is mainly a residential area, and is part of the developing Canaan-BonAccord region of Tobago which benefits from proximity to the CrownPoint airport and the main thoroughfare: Milford Road which connects to the capital Scarborough.

The town's roads are arranged in a regular grid found on the north side of Milford Road. Most streets run N-S and connect Milford road to its parallel: Guy Street.

== Climate ==
Climate data for Canaan
Month	Jan	Feb	Mar	Apr	May	Jun	Jul	Aug	Sep	Oct	Nov	Dec	Year
Mean daily maximum °C (°F)	28 (83)	29 (84)	29 (85)	30 (86)	30 (86)	29 (85)	29 (84)	29 (85)	30 (86)	29 (85)	29 (84)	29 (84)	29 (85)
Mean daily minimum °C (°F)	24 (75)	24 (75)	24 (76)	26 (78)	26 (79)	26 (78)	26 (78)	26 (78)	26 (78)	26 (78)	25 (77)	24 (76)	25 (77)
Average precipitation cm (inches)	5.1 (2)	6.9 (2.7)	8.6 (3.4)	5.8 (2.3)	8.6 (3.4)	12 (4.6)	19 (7.6)	13 (5.2)	14 (5.5)	17 (6.6)	11 (4.4)	15 (5.8)	59 (23.4)
Source: Weatherbase
