= 2007–08 Cardiff City F.C. season =

Welsh football club season

Cardiff City
2007–08 season
- Chairman: Peter Ridsdale
- Manager: Dave Jones
- Championship: 12th
- FA Cup: Runners-up
- League Cup: Fourth round
- FAW Premier Cup: Semi-finals
- Top goalscorer: League: Joe Ledley; Paul Parry (10 each); All: Joe Ledley; Paul Parry (11 each)
- Highest home attendance: 18,840 vs Stoke City (11 August 2007)
- Lowest home attendance: 11,006 vs Colchester United (8 December 2007)
- Average home league attendance: 13,939

During the 2007–08 season Cardiff City played in the Football League Championship. It was the team's fifth consecutive season in the second tier since being promoted from the third tier (Division Two, now known as League One). The season was the first full year in charge for chairman Peter Ridsdale after taking over from Sam Hammam the previous year.

== Season review ==
=== Team kit and sponsorship ===
Cardiff's shirts for this season were made by Joma. Their shirt sponsorship was a version of the previous years, Communications Direct, which had been shortened to just Comms Direct.

=== Events ===
This section does not list information about match results or player transfers.

- 15 August 2007 – Major financial backers of the club Langston announce they have initiated legal proceedings against the club over claims they have not repaid a £30 million loan.
- 7 September 2007 – Chairman Peter Ridsdale reveals that the club's new ground had fallen behind schedule and will not be ready until May 2009.
- 29 October 2007 – Ex-Wales rugby union captain Mike Hall resigns from the club board over a possible conflict of interest between his company PMG Associates and Langston.
- 2 November 2007 – Construction of Cardiff's new stadium gets under way with a ceremonial 'cutting of the turf' ceremony between Peter Ridsdale and Cardiff council leader Rodney Berman.
- 13 November 2007 – Cardiff board members hold a meeting and hand manager Dave Jones a vote of confidence as long as results improve.
- 15 November 2007 – Club creditors Langston state that should it win its court case against Cardiff it would not put the club into administration.
- 12 December 2007 – The club's court case with Langston is postponed after the company requested a deferral.
- 12 March 2008 – The club's court case with creditors Langston begins at the High Court.
- 19 March 2008 – A high court judge dismisses Langston's call for a summary judgement. A two-month wait for any further court action is announced for parties to try to agree terms.
- 24 May 2008 – Cardiff Blues rugby team sign an agreement which will see them become tenants at the club's new ground for a period of 20 years.

=== Preseason ===
Cardiff enjoyed a successful pre-season winning five out of their six friendlies. The previous season's top scorer Michael Chopra began pre-season well with two goals in the first match against near-by Welsh side Merthyr Tydfil but that was to be his last participation in the Bluebirds season as he left the club to join newly promoted Premiership side Sunderland. Manager Dave Jones had little resources on which to build a side but managed to make several additions by the time Cardiff travelled to Portugal for a two-game tour. Winning both games with new signings Steve MacLean and Gavin Rae impressing. During the two games Cardiff handed appearances to four on trial players, Cyprus international winger Constantinos Charalambidis, former Greece under-21 international goalkeeper Kleopas Giannou, Portuguese goalkeeper Ricardo Oliveira and Portuguese defender Marco Almeida. However, none were offered permanent deals at the club. They returned home to take a 2–0 win over Yeovil Town before they suffered their only loss during pre-season in a 6–4 defeat to Stockport County. One more player arrived at this point, Robbie Fowler was the surprise signing unveiled at Ninian Park and featured in the 1–0 victory over Dutch Eredivisie side FC Twente in their final pre-season game.

=== Regular season ===
Cardiff began the season at home to Stoke City, the first time they had been given a home tie to open the season in eleven years, falling to a 1–0 defeat after a goal from Ryan Shawcross. They picked up their first win of the season against Queens Park Rangers the following weekend but the Bluebirds struggled to live up to the expectations laid on them at the start of the year and by the end of October they found themselves hovering above the relegation zone. Several poor results saw manager Dave Jones come under intense pressure to be sacked but on 15 November the Cardiff board voted to keep Jones in the job on the condition that the team's results improve in the next few weeks. Steadily results did begin to improve but on 4 December Cardiff were beaten 2–0 at home by Charlton Athletic and the team's performance was slammed by critics. However the team responded well to the negative response and came back to win three of their next four games, against Colchester United, Blackpool and Sheffield United, three teams also near Cardiff at the foot of the table. They continued their good spell of results into the new year with wins against Preston North End, Plymouth Argyle and Sheffield Wednesday. The team's impressive form saw manager Jones named as Championship manager of the month and midfielder Joe Ledley named player of the month for January, only for Cardiff to lose the next two games against Stoke City and Norwich City. After mixed results in February and early March the team began to push for promotion and with four games remaining members of the squad stated that they would have to win all four remaining games to make the play-offs, only for them to lose to already relegated Scunthorpe United and play off hopefuls Wolverhampton Wanderers in their next two games before finishing the season with a 3–0 victory over Barnsley.

==== Standings ====
Pos	Team	Pld	W	D	L	GF	GA	GD	Pts
10	Plymouth Argyle	46	17	13	16	60	50	+10	64
11	Charlton Athletic	46	17	13	16	63	58	+5	64
12	Cardiff City	46	16	16	14	59	55	+4	64
13	Burnley	46	16	14	16	60	67	−7	62
14	Queens Park Rangers	46	14	16	16	60	66	−6	58

Updated to match(es) played on 4 May 2008. Source: The Football League
Rules for classification: 1) points; 2) goal difference; 3) number of goals scored.

==== League statistics ====
Overall								Home						Away					
Pld	W	D	L	GF	GA	GD	Pts	W	D	L	GF	GA	GD	W	D	L	GF	GA	GD
46	16	16	14	59	55	+4	64	12	4	7	31	21	+10	4	12	7	28	34	−6

Last updated: End of season.
Source: The Football League

=== Cups ===
==== FA Cup ====
Cardiff's first match in the FA Cup was away to non-league Chasetown who became the lowest ranked side ever to reach the third round of the competition and, despite an early scare when Kevin McNaughton turned the ball into his own net, they eventually came away with a 3–1 victory. The fourth and fifth round ties saw the Bluebirds go through with little trouble after wins over Hereford United and Wolverhampton Wanderers. With those results, Cardiff reached the quarter-finals and were rewarded with a trip to Premiership side Middlesbrough. A tough match was predicted but Cardiff got off to a great start when Peter Whittingham found his way through a crowd of defenders to score and Roger Johnson headed in meaning the match was all but over after just 23 minutes. The semi-final saw Cardiff come up against Championship opposition for the second time in Barnsley at Wembley Stadium and a Joe Ledley goal in the opening 10 minutes was the only thing that separated the two clubs at the final whistle sending Cardiff into their first FA Cup final since they won the trophy in 1927.

The final saw Cardiff face Portsmouth, who advanced after beating West Bromwich Albion in the semi-final. The match was played on 17 May at Wembley and a crowd of over 89,000 saw Portsmouth claim the cup after a goal from Nwankwo Kanu in the 37th minute.

==== League Cup ====
A mixture of first team and reserve players saw Cardiff come away with 1–0 wins over Football League One sides Brighton and Leyton Orient in the opening rounds before they were drawn against Championship side West Bromwich Albion. The match saw Cardiff go 4–0 up in 30 minutes with goals from veteran trio Robbie Fowler, Jimmy Floyd Hasselbaink and Trevor Sinclair and, despite an attempted comeback from West Brom, the match finished 4–2.

The fourth round saw Cardiff drawn against Liverpool with the main focus of the match being the return of Robbie Fowler to Anfield. After falling behind from a goal from Nabil El Zhar, Cardiff managed an equaliser when captain Darren Purse headed in a cross, only for Steven Gerrard to score the winner a minute later.

==== FAW Premier Cup ====
Cardiff were drawn against Welshpool Town for their first match and a team made up of mostly youth players with a handful of reserves came away with a 1–0 win after youngster Jonathan Brown scored on his first team debut. Newport County were the club's opponents in the semi-final and despite adding several more of the more experienced reserve players to the side they were beaten on penalties. The match also saw a number of former Cardiff players such as Lee Jarman and Damon Searle return to Ninian Park.

== Squad ==
Note: Flags indicate national team as defined under FIFA eligibility rules; some limited exceptions apply. Players may hold more than one non-FIFA nationality.

No.	Pos.	Nation	Player
1	GK	FIN	Peter Enckelman (on loan from Blackburn Rovers)
2	DF	SCO	Kevin McNaughton
3	DF	NIR	Tony Capaldi
4	MF	SCO	Gavin Rae
5	DF	ENG	Darren Purse (Captain)
6	DF	NED	Glenn Loovens
7	MF	ENG	Peter Whittingham
8	FW	ENG	Robbie Fowler
10	MF	IRL	Stephen McPhail (Vice-Captain)
11	MF	WAL	Paul Parry
12	DF	ENG	Roger Johnson
13	GK	ENG	Michael Oakes
14	FW	NIR	Warren Feeney
15	GK	IRL	David Forde (on loan to Bournemouth)

No.	Pos.	Nation	Player
16	MF	WAL	Joe Ledley
18	MF	ENG	Trevor Sinclair
19	MF	ENG	Riccardo Scimeca
20	FW	SCO	Steve Thompson
23	MF	WAL	Darcy Blake
25	GK	POL	Erwin Sak
26	MF	WAL	Jonathan Brown
27	FW	ENG	Matt Green (on loan to Oxford United)
29	DF	WAL	Matthew Smith (on loan to Newport County)
30	MF	WAL	Aaron Ramsey
31	FW	NIR	Josh Magennis
36	FW	NED	Jimmy Floyd Hasselbaink
—	MF	IRL	Willo Flood (on loan to Dundee United)

=== Detailed overview ===
No.	Name	Nat.	Place of birth	Date of birth	Club apps.	Club goals	Int. caps	Int. goals	Previous club	Date joined	Fee	End^{1}
1	Peter Enckelman	(Finland)	Turku	10 March 1977	–	–	12	0	Blackburn Rovers	10 January 2008	Loan	2008
2	Kevin McNaughton	(Scotland)	Dundee	28 August 1982	44	0	3	0	Aberdeen	26 May 2006	Free	2009
3	Tony Capaldi	(Northern Ireland)	Porsgrunn (Norway)	12 August 1981	–	–	21	0	Plymouth Argyle	25 May 2007	Free	2010
4	Gavin Rae	(Scotland)	Aberdeen	28 November 1977	–	–	12	0	Rangers	23 June 2007	Free	2010
5	Darren Purse	(England)	Stepney	14 February 1977	76	10	–	–	West Bromwich Albion	28 July 2005	£1,000,000	2008
6	Glenn Loovens	(Netherlands)	Doetinchem	22 October 1983	68	3	–	–	Feyenoord	9 May 2006	£250,000	2009
7	Peter Whittingham	(England)	Nuneaton	8 September 1984	19	4	–	–	Aston Villa	11 January 2007	£350,000	2011
8	Robbie Fowler	(England)	Liverpool	9 April 1975	–	–	26	7	Liverpool	22 July 2007	Free	2009
10	Stephen McPhail	(Republic of Ireland)	London (England)	9 December 1979	45	0	10	1	Barnsley	13 June 2006	Free	2009
11	Paul Parry	(Wales)	Chepstow	19 August 1980	118	12	12	1	Hereford United	9 January 2004	£75,000	2009
12	Roger Johnson	(England)	Ashford	28 April 1987	33	2	–	–	Wycombe Wanderers	4 July 2006	£275,000	2009
13	Michael Oakes	(England)	Northwich	30 October 1973	–	–	–	–	Wolverhampton Wanderers	7 July 2007	Free	2008
14	Warren Feeney	(Northern Ireland)	Belfast	17 January 1981	6	0	23	3	Luton Town	1 June 2007	Free	2009
15	David Forde	(Republic of Ireland)	Galway	20 December 1979	8	0	–	–	Derry City	5 December 2006	Free	2009
16	Joe Ledley	(Wales)	Cardiff	23 January 1987	126	10	8	0	N/A	1 June 2004	Trainee	2009
18	Trevor Sinclair	(England)	London	2 March 1973	–	–	12	0	Manchester City	10 July 2007	Free	2008
19	Riccardo Scimeca	(England)	Leamington Spa	13 June 1975	55	6	–	–	West Bromwich Albion	13 January 2006	Free	2009
20	Steve Thompson	(Scotland)	Paisley	14 October 1978	59	10	16	3	Rangers	10 January 2006	£250,000	2008
23	Darcy Blake	(Wales)	New Tredegar	13 December 1988	14	0	–	–	N/A	8 November 2006	Trainee	2009
25	Erwin Sak	(Poland)	Lublin	15 February 1990	–	–	–	–	Sokół Pniewy	19 February 2008	Free	2009
26	Jonathan Brown	(Wales)	Bridgend	17 April 1990	–	–	–	–	N/A	1 June 2007	Trainee	2009
27	Matt Green	(England)	Bath	2 January 1987	6	0	–	–	Newport County	31 January 2007	£10,000	2008
28	Matthew Smith	(Wales)	Cardiff		–	–	–	–	N/A	1 June 2007	Trainee	2008
30	Aaron Ramsey	(Wales)	Caerphilly	26 December 1990	1	0	–	–	N/A	1 June 2006	Trainee	2008
31	Josh Magennis	(Northern Ireland)	Bangor	15 August 1990	–	–	–	–	N/A	1 June 2007	Trainee	2010
36	Jimmy Floyd Hasselbaink	(Netherlands)	Paramaribo (Suriname)	27 March 1972	–	–	23	9	Charlton Athletic	16 August 2007	Free	2008

== Squad statistics ==
No.	Pos	Nat	Player	Total		Championship		FA Cup		League Cup		FAW Premier Cup	
No.	Pos	Nat	Player	Apps	Goals	Apps	Goals	Apps	Goals	Apps	Goals	Apps	Goals
1	GK	(Finland) FIN	Peter Enckelman	20	0	15+1	0	4	0	0	0	0	0
1	GK	(Denmark) DEN	Kasper Schmeichel*	14	0	14	0	0	0	0	0	0	0
1	GK	(England) ENG	Ross Turnbull*	8	0	6	0	0	0	2	0	0	0
2	DF	(Scotland) SCO	Kevin McNaughton	43	2	35	1	6	1	2	0	0	0
3	DF	(Northern Ireland) NIR	Tony Capaldi	54	0	43+1	0	6	0	4	0	0	0
4	MF	(Scotland) SCO	Gavin Rae	55	4	40+5	4	6	0	4	0	0	0
5	DF	(England) ENG	Darren Purse	23	2	12+6	1	0	0	3	1	2	0
6	DF	(Netherlands) NED	Glenn Loovens	44	0	36	0	6	0	1	0	1	0
7	MF	(England) ENG	Peter Whittingham	51	9	25+16	5	6	3	2+2	1	0	0
8	FW	(England) ENG	Robbie Fowler	16	6	10+3	4	0	0	3	2	0	0
9	FW	(Scotland) SCO	Steve MacLean*	18	1	6+9	1	1	0	1+1	0	0	0
10	MF	(Republic of Ireland) IRL	Stephen McPhail	52	3	42+1	3	5	0	4	0	0	0
11	MF	(Wales) WAL	Paul Parry	50	11	37+4	10	5	1	4	0	0	0
12	DF	(England) ENG	Roger Johnson	52	7	41+1	5	6	1	4	1	0	0
13	GK	(England) ENG	Michael Oakes	15	0	11	0	2	0	2	0	0	0
14	FW	(Northern Ireland) NIR	Warren Feeney	6	0	1+4	0	0	0	1	0	0	0
15	GK	(Republic of Ireland) IRL	David Forde	2	0	0	0	0	0	0	0	2	0
16	MF	(Wales) WAL	Joe Ledley	48	11	38+3	10	4	1	2+1	0	0	0
17	MF	(England) ENG	Kevin Cooper*	1	0	0	0	0	0	0	0	1	0
18	MF	(England) ENG	Trevor Sinclair	27	2	14+7	1	1+3	0	1	1	1	0
19	MF	(England) ENG	Riccardo Scimeca	11	0	4+5	0	0+1	0	0	0	1	0
20	FW	(Scotland) SCO	Steve Thompson	43	7	17+19	5	1+4	1	0+1	0	1	1
23	MF	(Wales) WAL	Darcy Blake	13	0	4+4	0	0+3	0	0+1	0	1	0
26	MF	(Wales) WAL	Jonathan Brown	4	1	0+2	0	0	0	0	0	2	1
27	FW	(England) ENG	Matt Green	2	0	0	0	0	0	0+1	0	1	0
30	MF	(Wales) WAL	Aaron Ramsey	22	2	11+4	1	3+2	1	0+1	0	1	0
36	FW	(Netherlands) NED	Jimmy Floyd Hasselbaink	44	9	33+3	7	4+1	1	3	1	0	0
44	DF	(Wales) WAL	Chris Gunter*	17	0	11+2	0	0	0	2+2	0	0	0

* Indicates player left the club during the season.

=== Disciplinary record ===
Number	Pos	Player	Yellow card	Red card
6	DF	Glenn Loovens	12	0
10	MF	Stephen McPhail	7	0
3	DF	Tony Capaldi	5	0
16	MF	Joe Ledley	4	0
20	FW	Steve Thompson	4	1
36	FW	Jimmy Floyd Hasselbaink	3	1
2	DF	Kevin McNaughton	3	0
5	DF	Darren Purse	3	0
4	MF	Gavin Rae	3	0
12	DF	Roger Johnson	2	0
9	FW	Steve MacLean	2	0
11	MF	Paul Parry	2	0
7	MF	Peter Whittingham	2	0
23	MF	Darcy Blake	1	0
44	DF	Chris Gunter	1	0
30	MF	Aaron Ramsey	1	0
1	GK	Kasper Schmeichel	1	0
19	MF	Riccardo Scimeca	1	0
18	MF	Trevor Sinclair	1	0

== Transfers ==
=== Summer transfer window ins ===
	Player	Club	Fee
3	Tony Capaldi	Plymouth Argyle	Free Transfer
8	Robbie Fowler	Liverpool	Free Transfer
36	Jimmy Floyd Hasselbaink	Charlton Athletic	Free Transfer
9	Steve MacLean	Sheffield Wednesday	Free Transfer
13	Michael Oakes	Wolves	Free Transfer
4	Gavin Rae	Rangers	Free Transfer
18	Trevor Sinclair	Manchester City	Free Transfer

=== Loans in ===
#	Player	Club	Arrival date	Return date
1	Ross Turnbull	Middlesbrough	29 July	5 October
1	Kasper Schmeichel	Manchester City	25 October	3 January
1	Peter Enckelman	Blackburn Rovers	10 January	End of season

=== Summer transfer window outs ===
* Indicates that the player joined club after being released by Cardiff

#	Player	Club	Fee
	Neil Alexander	Ipswich Town*	Free Transfer
	Scott Allison	Hartlepool United*	Free Transfer
	Chris Barker	QPR	Free Transfer
	Kevin Campbell	Retired	–
	Michael Chopra	Sunderland	£5m
	Gregg Coombes	Carmarthen Town*	Free Transfer
	Michael Corcoran	Oxford United*	Free Transfer
	Jamal Easter	Carmarthen Town*	Free Transfer
	Luigi Glombard	Grenoble Foot 38*	Free Transfer
	Mark Howard	St Mirren*	Free Transfer
	Joe Jacobson	Bristol Rovers	Free Transfer
	Martyn Margetson	Retired	–
	Scott McCoubrey	Port Talbot Town	Released
	Curtis McDonald	Carmarthen Town*	Free Transfer
	Nick McKoy	Unattached	Released
	Jeff Whitley	Unattached	Released

=== January transfer window ins ===
#	Player	Club	Fee
25	Erwin Sak	Sokol Pniewy	Free

=== January transfer window outs ===
#	Player	Club	Fee
26	Jason Byrne	Bohemians	Free
17	Kevin Cooper	Chesterfield*	Free
44	Chris Gunter	Tottenham Hotspur	£1.5m
9	Steve MacLean	Plymouth Argyle	£500,000

=== Loans out ===
#	Player	Club	Departure date	Return date
	Willo Flood	Dundee United	12 June	End of season
14	Warren Feeney	Swansea City	21 August	1 January
29	Matt Green	Darlington	8 October	8 November
17	Kevin Cooper	Tranmere Rovers	25 October	25 November
27	Matt Green	Oxford United	22 November	22 December
	Bradley Middleton	Dorchester Town	18 December	29 January
27	Matt Green	Oxford United	25 January	End of season
15	David Forde	Bournemouth	6 March	End of season
29	Matt Smith	Newport County	March 2008	End of season

== Fixtures & Results ==
=== Results by round ===
Round	1	2	3	4	5	6	7	8	9	10	11	12	13	14	15	16	17	18	19	20	21	22	23	24	25	26	27	28	29	30	31	32	33	34	35	36	37	38	39	40	41	42	43	44	45	46
Ground	H	A	H	A	A	H	H	A	A	H	A	H	H	H	A	H	A	A	H	H	A	A	H	A	A	H	H	A	H	A	H	A	A	H	A	H	A	H	H	H	A	H	A	A	A	H
Result	L	W	L	W	D	L	D	D	D	W	L	L	D	D	L	W	D	D	L	W	W	L	W	D	W	W	W	D	W	L	L	D	L	L	D	W	D	W	W	D	D	W	L	L	D	W
Position		12	19	10	9	15	17	17	15	12	15	16	17	19	20	18	18	20	20	17	15	16	15	15	12	11	8	8	7	9	11	11	13	14	14	12	14	13	12	12	12	10	13	13	13	12
Points	0	3	3	6	7	7	8	9	10	13	13	13	14	15	15	18	19	20	20	23	26	26	29	30	33	36	39	40	43	43	43	44	44	44	45	48	49	52	55	56	57	60	60	60	61	64

A = Away; H = Home; W = Win; D = Draw; L = Loss

=== Friendlies ===
Date	Opponent	Venue	Result	Attendance	Scorers
7 Jul	Merthyr Tydfil (Southern Premier Division)	A	W 2 – 0	–	Chopra (2)
11 Jul	Pourtegese FA XI (Portugal)	A	W 2 – 1	Approx. 600	Charalambidis, Green
14 Jul	Vitoria de Setúbal (Primeira Liga)	A	W 1 – 0	–	MacLean
21 Jul	Yeovil Town (League One)	A	W 2 – 0	2,371	Feeney(pen), MacLean(pen)
28 Jul	Stockport County (League Two)	A	L 4 – 6	3,125	Rae, Sinclair, MacLean, Whittingham
4 Aug	FC Twente (Dutch Eredivisie)	H	W 1 – 0	–	Feeney

=== Championship ===
11 August 2007 1	Cardiff City	0–1	Stoke City	Cardiff
15:00		BBC report	27' Ryan Shawcross	Stadium: Ninian Park; Attendance: 18,840; Referee: Steve Tanner (East Sussex)

18 August 2007 2	Queens Park Rangers	0–2	Cardiff City	London
15:00			29' Steve MacLean; 59' Paul Parry	Stadium: Loftus Road; Attendance: 12,596; Referee: Phil Joslin (Nottinghamshire)

25 August 2007 3	Cardiff City	0–1	Coventry City	Cardiff
15:00			34' Jay Tabb	Stadium: Ninian Park; Attendance: 16,407; Referee: Rob Shoebridge (Derby)

1 September 2007 4	Norwich City	1–2	Cardiff City	Norwich
15:00	Simon Lappin 12'		64' Peter Whittingham; 84' Roger Johnson	Stadium: Carrow Road; Attendance: 24,292; Referee: Clive Penton (Sussex)

15 September 2007 5	Plymouth Argyle	2–2	Cardiff City	Plymouth
17:20	Sylvan Ebanks-Blake 30', 58'		71' Gavin Rae; 89' Steve Thompson	Stadium: Home Park; Attendance: 11,591; Referee: Richard Beeby (Northampton)

19 September 2007 6	Cardiff City	1–2	Watford	Cardiff
19:45	Jimmy Floyd Hasselbaink 61'		17', 78' Darius Henderson	Stadium: Ninian Park; Attendance: 13,169; Referee: Lee Probert (Gloucestershire)

22 September 2007 7	Cardiff City	2–2	Preston North End	Cardiff
12:45	Robbie Fowler 28', 61'		51', 90' Callum Davidson	Stadium: Ninian Park; Attendance: 11,772; Referee: Andy Hall (West Midlands)

29 September 2007 8	Barnsley	1–1	Cardiff City	Barnsley
15:00	Brian Howard 84'		73' Jimmy Floyd Hasselbaink	Stadium: Oakwell; Attendance: 10,709; Referee: Phil Dowd (Stoke-on-Trent)

2 October 2007 9	Sheffield United	3–3	Cardiff City	Sheffield
19:45	James Beattie 18'; Chris Armstrong 85'; Chris Morgan 90'		31' Joe Ledley; 45' (pen.) Robbie Fowler; 59' Gavin Rae	Stadium: Bramall Lane; Attendance: 26,186; Referee: Andy D'Urso (Billericay)

6 October 2007 10	Cardiff City	2–1	Burnley	Cardiff
15:00	Joe Ledley 36'; Paul Parry 55'		50' Ade Akinbiyi	Stadium: Ninian Park; Attendance: 12,914; Referee: Andy Penn (West Midlands)

21 October 2007 11	Southampton	1–0	Cardiff City	Southampton
13:15	Stern John 15'			Stadium: St Mary's Stadium; Attendance: 20,796; Referee: Alan Wiley (Staffordshire)

24 October 2007 12	Cardiff City	2–3	Wolverhampton Wanderers	Cardiff
19:45	Robbie Fowler 25' (pen.); Jimmy Floyd Hasselbaink 29'		13', 65' Michael Kightly; 74' Jody Craddock	Stadium: Ninian Park; Attendance: 15,000; Referee: Paul Taylor (Middlesex)

27 October 2007 13	Cardiff City	1–1	Scunthorpe United	Cardiff
15:00	Stephen McPhail 37'		55' Jim Goodwin	Stadium: Ninian Park; Attendance: 11,850; Referee: Keith Hill (Hertfordshire)

6 November 2007 14	Cardiff City	1–1	Crystal Palace	Cardiff
19:45	Darren Purse 9'		44' (pen.) Ben Watson	Stadium: Ninian Park; Attendance: 11,781; Referee: Lee Mason (Bolton)

10 November 2007 15	Charlton Athletic	3–0	Cardiff City	London
15:00	Sam Sodje 44'; Chris Iwelumo 45'; Zheng Zhi 80'			Stadium: The Valley; Attendance: 22,866; Referee: Mike Jones (Chester)

24 November 2007 16	Cardiff City	1–0	Ipswich Town	Cardiff
12:00	Paul Parry 33'			Stadium: Ninian Park; Attendance: 15,173; Referee: Anthony Bates (Stoke-on-Trent)

26 November 2007 17	Leicester City	0–0	Cardiff City	Leicester
20:00				Stadium: Walkers Stadium; Attendance: 16,269; Referee: Nigel Miller (Co Durham)

1 December 2007 18	Hull City	2–2	Cardiff City	Hull
15:00	Stephen McPhee 3'; Richard Garcia 43'		6' Steve Thompson; 90' Roger Johnson	Stadium: KC Stadium; Attendance: 16,269; Referee: Mike Dean (Wirral)

4 December 2007 19	Cardiff City	0–2	Charlton Athletic	Cardiff
19:45			34' Matt Holland; 79' (pen.) Andy Reid	Stadium: Ninian Park; Attendance: 11,874; Referee: Jon Moss (Yorkshire)

8 December 2007 20	Cardiff City	4–1	Colchester United	Cardiff
15:00	Steve Thompson 52'; Peter Whittingham 57'; Jimmy Floyd Hasselbaink 66'; Adam Virgo 70' (o.g.)		45' Johnnie Jackson	Stadium: Ninian Park; Attendance: 11,006; Referee: Rob Shoebridge (Derby)

11 December 2007 21	Blackpool	0–1	Cardiff City	Blackpool
19:45			14' Steve Thompson	Stadium: Bloomfield Road; Attendance: 7,214; Referee: Eddie Ilderton (Tyne and Wear)

15 December 2007 22	Bristol City	1–0	Cardiff City	Bristol
15:00	Marvin Elliott 57'			Stadium: Ashton Gate; Attendance: 15,753; Referee: Uriah Rennie (South Yorkshire)

22 December 2007 23	Cardiff City	1–0	Sheffield United	Cardiff
15:00	Paul Parry 30'			Stadium: Ninian Park; Attendance: 12,869; Referee: Keith Stroud (Dorset)

26 December 2007 24	Watford	2–2	Cardiff City	Watford
12:00	Jay DeMerit 49'; Jobi McAnuff 90'		34' Roger Johnson; 56' Peter Whittingham	Stadium: Vicarage Road; Attendance: 17,014; Referee: Grant Hegley (Hertfordshire)

29 December 2007 25	Preston North End	1–2	Cardiff City	Preston
15:00	Simon Whaley 5'		53' Roger Johnson; 67' Joe Ledley	Stadium: Deepdale; Attendance: 12,046; Referee: Mark Haywood (West Yorkshire)

1 January 2008 26	Cardiff City	1–0	Plymouth Argyle	Cardiff
13:00	Joe Ledley 30'			Stadium: Ninian Park; Attendance: 14,965; Referee: Alan Wiley (Staffordshire)

12 January 2008 27	Cardiff City	1–0	Sheffield Wednesday	Cardiff
15:00	Jimmy Floyd Hasselbaink 36'			Stadium: Ninian Park; Attendance: 14,015; Referee: Andy Woolmer (Northamptonshire)

19 January 2008 28	West Bromwich Albion	3–3	Cardiff City	West Bromwich
15:00	Roman Bednar 35'; Martin Albrechtsen 72'; Roger Johnson 88' (o.g.)		1', 33' Paul Parry; 52' Joe Ledley	Stadium: The Hawthorns; Attendance: 22,325; Referee: Kevin Friend (Leicestershire)

29 January 2008 29	Cardiff City	3–1	Queens Park Rangers	Cardiff
19:45	Joe Ledley 12', 40'; Paul Parry 57'		76' Patrick Agyemang	Stadium: Ninian Park; Attendance: 13,602; Referee: Peter Walton (Northamptonshire)

2 February 2008 30	Stoke City	2–1	Cardiff City	Stoke
12:30	Roger Johnson 39' (o.g.); Ricardo Fuller 57' (pen.)		63' Jimmy Floyd Hasselbaink	Stadium: Britannia Stadium; Attendance: 15,045; Referee: Steve Bennett (Kent)

9 February 2008 31	Cardiff City	1–2	Norwich City	Cardiff
12:00	Gavin Rae 45'		15', 88' Ched Evans	Stadium: Ninian Park; Attendance: 11,937; Referee: Richard Beeby (Northampton)

12 February 2008 32	Coventry City	0–0	Cardiff City	Coventry
19:45				Stadium: Ricoh Arena; Attendance: 15,260; Referee: Danny McDermid (Hampshire)

23 February 2008 33	Sheffield Wednesday	1–0	Cardiff City	Sheffield
15:00	Marcus Tudgay 41'			Stadium: Hillsborough; Attendance: 18,539; Referee: Darren Deadman (Cambridgeshire)

1 March 2008 34	Cardiff City	0–1	Leicester City	Cardiff
15:00			27' (o.g.) Darren Purse	Stadium: Ninian Park; Attendance: 13,335; Referee: Mick Thorpe (Suffolk)

4 March 2008 35	Crystal Palace	0–0	Cardiff City	London
20:00				Stadium: Selhurst Park; Attendance: 13,446; Referee: Scott Mathieson (Cheshire)

12 March 2008 36	Cardiff City	1–0	Hull City	Cardiff
19:45	Stephen McPhail 2'			Stadium: Ninian Park; Attendance: 17,555; Referee: Lee Probert (Gloucestershire)

15 March 2008 37	Colchester United	1–1	Cardiff City	Colchester
15:00	Johnnie Jackson 71'		11' Paul Parry	Stadium: Layer Road; Attendance: 4,699; Referee: Kevin Wright (Cambridgeshire)

22 March 2008 38	Cardiff City	2–1	Bristol City	Cardiff
15:00	Roger Johnson 44'; Peter Whittingham 81'		73' Dele Adebola	Stadium: Ninian Park; Attendance: 16,458; Referee: Keith Stroud (Dorset)

29 March 2008 39	Cardiff City	1–0	Southampton	Cardiff
15:00	Paul Parry 6'			Stadium: Ninian Park; Attendance: 12,955; Referee: Mike Jones (Chester)

1 April 2008 40	Cardiff City	0–0	West Bromwich Albion	Cardiff
19:45				Stadium: Ninian Park; Attendance: 13,915; Referee: Martin Atkinson (West Yorkshire)

9 April 2008 41	Ipswich Town	1–1	Cardiff City	Ipswich
19:45	Jordan Rhodes 73'		37' Gavin Rae	Stadium: Portman Road; Attendance: 20,311; Referee: Russell Booth (Nottinghamshire)

12 April 2008 42	Cardiff City	3–1	Blackpool	Cardiff
15:00	Stephen McPhail 7'; Trevor Sinclair 50'; Peter Whittingham 58'		73' Andy Morrell	Stadium: Ninian Park; Attendance: 14,715; Referee: Anthony Bates (Stoke-on-Trent)

19 April 2008 43	Scunthorpe United	3–2	Cardiff City	Scunthorpe
15:00	Paul Hayes 53', 90' (pen.); Kevan Hurst 56'		45' Jimmy Floyd Hasselbaink; 59' Joe Ledley	Stadium: Glanford Park; Attendance: 4,727; Referee: Phil Joslin (Nottinghamshire)

22 April 2008 44	Wolverhampton Wanderers	3–0	Cardiff City	Wolverhampton
19:45	Andy Keogh 8'; Sylvan Ebanks-Blake 44'; Michael Kightly 56'			Stadium: Molineux; Attendance: 20,862; Referee: Mark Halsey (Bolton)

26 April 2008 45	Burnley	3–3	Cardiff City	Burnley
15:00	Graham Alexander 36'; Andrew Cole 54'; Clarke Carlisle 86'		57' (pen.) Joe Ledley; 69' Aaron Ramsey; 89' Steve Thompson	Stadium: Turf Moor; Attendance: 10,694; Referee: Andy Hall (West Midlands)

4 May 2008 46	Cardiff City	3–0	Barnsley	Cardiff
14:00	Paul Parry 44'; Kevin McNaughton 49'; Joe Ledley 63'			Stadium: Ninian Park; Attendance: 14,469; Referee: Clive Penton (Sussex)

=== FA Cup ===
5 January 2008 Round 3	Chasetown	1–3	Cardiff City	Chasetown
13:00	Kevin McNaughton 17' (o.g.)	BBC report Chasetown report	45' Peter Whittingham; 60' Aaron Ramsey; 73' Paul Parry	Stadium: The Scholars Ground; Attendance: 2,420; Referee: Graham Laws (Northumberland)

27 January 2008 Round 4	Hereford United	1–2	Cardiff City	Hereford
12:30	Theo Robinson 77'		45' Kevin McNaughton; 67' (pen.) Steve Thompson	Stadium: Edgar Street; Attendance: 6,855; Referee: Andy D'Urso (Billericay)

16 February 2008 Round 5	Cardiff City	2–0	Wolverhampton Wanderers	Cardiff
15:00	Peter Whittingham 2'; Jimmy Floyd Hasselbaink 11'			Stadium: Ninian Park; Attendance: 15,339; Referee: Rob Styles (Dorset)

16 February 2008 Round 6	Middlesbrough	0–2	Cardiff City	Middlesbrough
14:00		BBC report	9' Peter Whittingham; 23' Roger Johnson	Stadium: Riverside Stadium; Attendance: 32,896; Referee: Mike Dean (Wirral)

8 April 2008 Semi-final	Barnsley	0–1	Cardiff City	London
16:00		BBC report	9' Joe Ledley	Stadium: Wembley Stadium; Attendance: 82,752; Referee: Alan Wiley (Staffordshire)

17 May 2008 Final	Portsmouth	1–0	Cardiff City	London
15:00	Nwankwo Kanu 37'	BBC report		Stadium: Wembley Stadium; Attendance: 89,874; Referee: Mike Dean (Wirral)

=== League Cup ===
14 August 2007 Round 1	Cardiff City	1–0 (a.e.t.)	Brighton & Hove Albion	Cardiff
19:45	Roger Johnson 110'			Stadium: Ninian Park; Attendance: 3,726; Referee: Trevor Kettle (Berkshire)

28 August 2007 Round 2	Cardiff City	1–0	Leyton Orient	Cardiff
19:45	Peter Whittingham 90'			Stadium: Ninian Park; Attendance: 6,150; Referee: Mick Russell (Hertfordshire)

25 September 2007 Round 3	West Bromwich Albion	2–4	Cardiff City	West Bromwich
	Ishmael Miller 33', 87' (pen.)		4', 27' (pen.) Robbie Fowler; 23' Jimmy Floyd Hasselbaink; 30' Trevor Sinclair	Stadium: The Hawthorns; Attendance: 14,085; Referee: Peter Walton (Northamptonshire)

31 October 2007 Round 4	Liverpool	2–1	Cardiff City	Liverpool
	Nabil El Zhar 48'; Steven Gerrard 66'	BBC report ESPN report Liverpool report	65' Darren Purse	Stadium: Anfield; Attendance: 41,780; Referee: Peter Walton (Northamptonshire)

=== FAW Premier Cup ===
22 January 2008 Quarter-final	Welshpool Town	0–1	Cardiff City	Welshpool
		BBC report	85' Jonathan Brown	Stadium: Maes y Dre Recreation Ground; Attendance: 208; Referee: Lee Evans

19 February 2008 Semi-final	Cardiff City	1–1 (a.e.t.) (4–5 p)	Newport County	Cardiff
19:00	Steve Thompson 115'	BBC report	113' Jason Bowen	Stadium: Ninian Park; Attendance: 1,960; Referee: Lee Evans
	Penalties
	Sinclair (penalty scored); Blake (penalty scored); Loovens (penalty scored); Sam Wade (penalty scored); Thompson (penalty missed); Jack Carlile (penalty missed)		Bowen (penalty scored); Alsop (penalty scored); Evans (penalty scored); Fowler (penalty scored); Searle (penalty missed); Jarman (penalty scored)

== Awards ==
=== Won ===
January Championship manager of the month: Dave Jones
January Championship player of the month: Joe Ledley
Player of the semi-finals of the FA Cup: Joe Ledley

=== Nominated ===
Player of the third round of the FA Cup: Aaron Ramsey
Player of the fourth round of the FA Cup: Paul Parry
Player of the fifth round of the FA Cup: Jimmy Floyd Hasselbaink
Player of the quarter-finals of the FA Cup: Peter Whittingham

=== End-of-season awards ===
Player of the Year	Roger Johnson
Young Player of the Year	Aaron Ramsey
Most Improved Player of the Year	Peter Whittingham
Goal of the Season	Joe Ledley vs Barnsley, 6 Apr
Moment of the Year	Joe Ledley's goal vs Barnsley, 6 Apr
Disabled Association's Player of the Year	Joe Ledley
Man of the Match Award	Roger Johnson

Source: cardiffcity.com

== See also ==
- Cardiff City F.C.
- Cardiff City F.C. seasons
- 2007–08 in English football
