= 2008–09 Cardiff City F.C. season =

Welsh football club season

Cardiff City
2008–09 season
- Chairman: Peter Ridsdale
- Manager: Dave Jones
- Football League Championship: 7th
- FA Cup: Fourth round
- League Cup: Third round
- Top goalscorer: League: Ross McCormack (21); All: Ross McCormack (23)
- Highest home attendance: 20,156 vs Swansea City
- Lowest home attendance: 6,334 vs Milton Keynes Dons
- Average home league attendance: 18,449

The 2008–09 season was Cardiff City's sixth consecutive year playing in the Football League Championship and their 82nd season playing in The Football League. It was also the club's final season playing at Ninian Park, their home ground since they had entered The Football League in 1920.

== Season review ==
=== Events ===
- 9 September 2008 – Peter Ridsdale and the board of directors attend a "Topping Off" ceremony at the club's new stadium.
- 26 August 2008 – Ninian Park hold its last League Cup match in a 2–1 win against Milton Keynes Dons.
- 6 November 2009 – Dave Jones receives October manager of the month.
- 25 January 2009 – Ninian Park hold its last FA Cup match in a 0–0 draw against Arsenal.
- 25 April 2009 – Ninian Park holds its last league game, a 3–0 loss against Ipswich Town.

=== Pre-season ===
Cardiff began their pre-season schedule with matches against Welsh sides Merthyr Tydfil and Carmarthen Town, with squads made up of first team players and youth players. Goals from Steve Thompson, Jon Brown and youth player Sol Taylor saw a 3–1 win over Merthyr and a hat-trick from Paul Parry along with one from Rhys Kelleher and an own goal saw the other match end in a 5–0 win for Cardiff. Several days later, Cardiff flew out to Portugal to take part in the Algarve Cup, along with Middlesbrough, Celtic and Vitória de Guimarães. Before the tournament they played a warm-up match against Portuguese side Vitoria de Setubal which ended in a 1–1 draw.

Their Algarve Cup tournament began with a match against Vitória de Guimarães, coming away with a 2–0 win with both goals being scored by summer signing Ross McCormack. In the second and final game of the tournament they overcame Scottish Premier League champions Celtic 1–0 with Joe Ledley scoring the only goal as Cardiff came away as the tournament winners. Returning to Britain, they played out a 1–1 draw with Swindon Town followed by a 0–0 draw with Dutch side Ajax in their first home pre-season tie. They finished their pre-season schedule with a friendly against Chasetown with a team made up of senior and youth players. The match finished 2–2 with goals from Paul Parry and trialist Wilson Oruma.

=== League ===
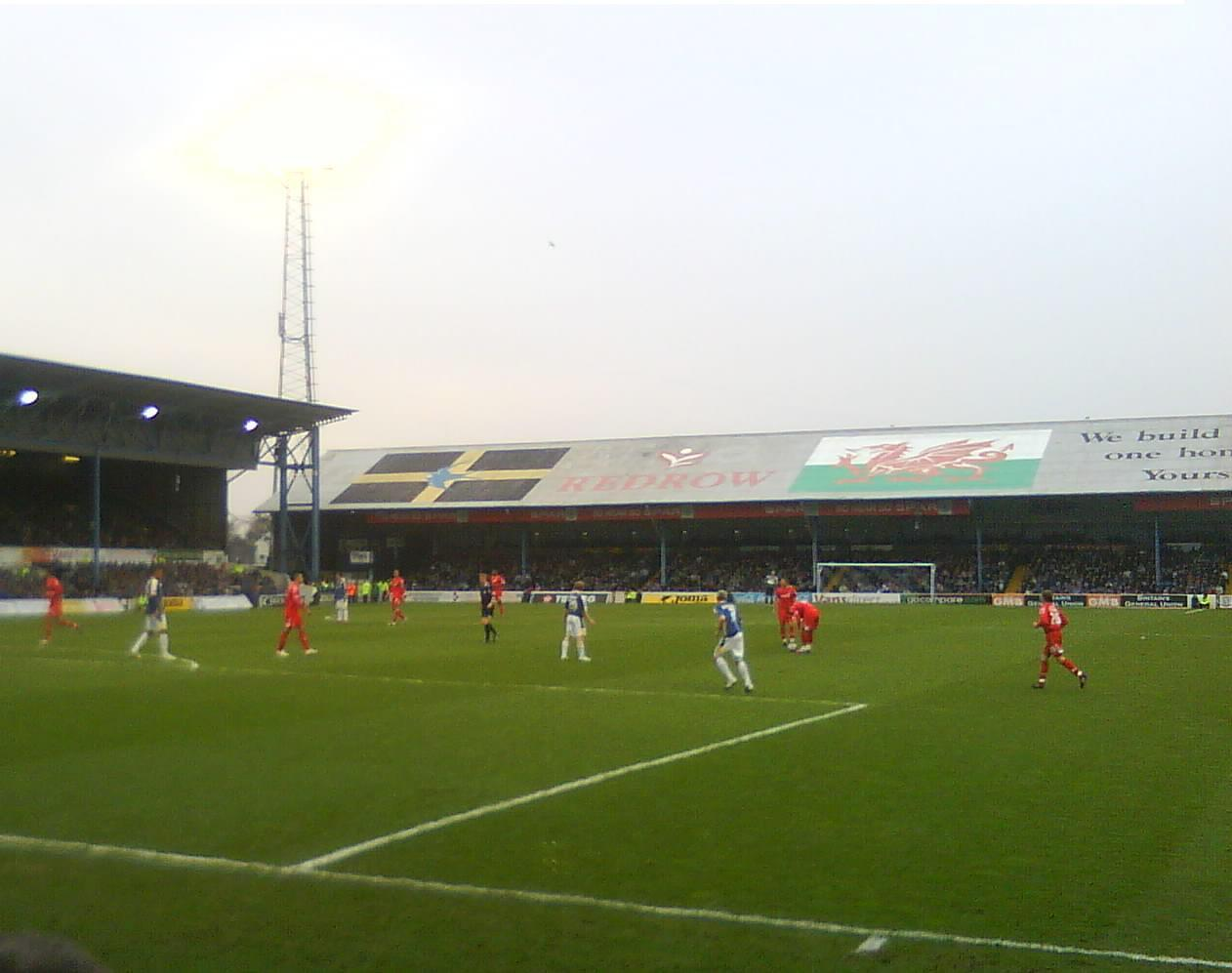
Cardiff City playing against Nottingham Forest on 31 January

Cardiff opened their season with a home tie against Southampton, the first time they had been handed a home tie on the opening day of the season for eleven years, and went on to win 2–1 after a last minute winner by Roger Johnson. Propelled by the goals of summer signing Ross McCormack, Cardiff did not suffer a defeat until their ninth league game of the season when they lost 2–1 to Birmingham City, but they bounced back quickly with a 2–1 win over Coventry City three days later and the sides form through October, three wins and two draws, saw manager Dave Jones awarded the manager of the month award.

A slump in form saw three defeats in the next four games but despite the loss of form the side remained in the play-off zone. During the poor spell, former player Michael Chopra returned on loan just over a year after leaving the club in a club record £5m sale to Sunderland, converting a penalty on his debut in a 2–1 win over Crystal Palace on 15 November. On 22 November, the second South Wales derby of the season took place, after an earlier meeting in the League Cup, with the match ending in a 2–2 draw with both sides being reduced to ten men due to red cards for Stephen McPhail and Darren Pratley. The match was the second of what would become a three-month unbeaten spell which took the side through to the end of February without defeat until they lost 1–0 to Southampton, a run which saw Cardiff rise to 4th place in the table.

The following game saw Cardiff win 3–1 against Barnsley, the first time in the season they had scored more than two goals in a single game. They went on to win 3 of their 6 matches in March before meeting local rivals Swansea City for the third time during the season on 5 April. The match ended in a 2–2 draw but was overshadowed by referee Mike Dean being struck by a coin thrown from the crowd. The incident was condemned by chairman Peter Ridsdale and manager Dave Jones after the match. Three consecutive wins for the side meant that with 4 games remaining they needed two points to secure a play-off place but they only managed one point during the final four games, in a 2–2 draw with Charlton Athletic, which would lead to them finishing in seventh place, missing out on a play-off spot to Preston North End on goals scored.

=== Final league standings ===
Pos	Team	Pld	W	D	L	GF	GA	GD	Pts	Promotion, qualification or relegation
5	Burnley (O, P)	46	21	13	12	72	60	+12	76	Qualification for Championship play-offs
6	Preston North End	46	21	11	14	66	54	+12	74	Qualification for Championship play-offs
7	Cardiff City	46	19	17	10	65	53	+12	74	
8	Swansea City	46	16	20	10	63	50	+13	68	
9	Ipswich Town	46	17	15	14	62	53	+9	66	

Updated to match(es) played on 3 May 2009. Source: The Football League
Rules for classification: 1) points; 2) goal difference; 3) number of goals scored.
(O) Play-off winners; (P) Promoted

==== Player presentations ====
As part of the celebrations of the club's final year at Ninian Park former players and staff of the club were presented to the crowd at half-time during various home matches throughout the season. At the end of the season all the players were invited back for the final game at the ground against Ipswich Town. The date, opponent and people presented were:

- 9 August 2008 – Southampton – Colin Baker and Alan Harrington
- 23 August 2008 – Norwich City – Don Murray and Bobby Woodruff
- 18 October 2008 – Charlton Athletic – Phil Dwyer and Richie Morgan
- 1 November 2008 – Wolverhampton Wanderers – Jeff Hemmerman and Chris Pike
- 15 November 2008 – Crystal Palace – Eddie May and Keith Pontin
- 20 December 2008 – Sheffield Wednesday – Carl Dale
- 5 April 2009 – Swansea City – John Williams
- 13 April 2009 – Burnley – David Carver and Derek Showers

=== League Cup ===
Cardiff began their League cup campaign away to League Two side Bournemouth, coming away with a 2–1 win with both goals scored by Paul Parry in the opening twelve minutes of the match. After coming through the second round with a 2–1 home win over Milton Keynes Dons, Cardiff were handed a third round tie against local rivals Swansea City in the first South Wales derby to take place in nine years. A heated encounter saw Swansea come away with a 1–0 after a deflected free-kick, with Cardiff being reduced to ten men after Stephen McPhail saw red for two bookable offences. After the match fans from both clubs clashed with police.

=== FA Cup ===
Entering the competition in the third round, Cardiff's first match in the FA Cup came up against fellow Championship side Reading, with goals from Ross McCormack and Joe Ledley putting Cardiff through to the next round with a 2–0 win. In the fourth round Cardiff were handed a lucrative home tie against Premier League side Arsenal. The match, taking place in a packed Ninian Park, finished in a 0–0 draw. The replay, which was originally set to be played on 3 February but was postponed due to heavy snowfall, took place on 16 February, ending in a 4–0 win for Arsenal.

== Kits ==
Supplier: Joma
Sponsor(s): Vansdirect.co.uk

Home	Home Alternate	Away	Alternative	Third Alternate

Last updated: 18 September 2012.
Source: Historical Football kits

== Squad at end of season ==
Note: Flags indicate national team as defined under FIFA eligibility rules; some limited exceptions apply. Players may hold more than one non-FIFA nationality.

No.	Pos.	Nation	Player
1	GK	FIN	Peter Enckelman
2	DF	SCO	Kevin McNaughton
3	DF	NIR	Tony Capaldi
4	MF	SCO	Gavin Rae
5	DF	ENG	Darren Purse (Captain)
6	DF	HUN	Gábor Gyepes
7	MF	ENG	Peter Whittingham
8	FW	ENG	Jay Bothroyd
9	FW	USA	Eddie Johnson (on loan from Fulham)
10	MF	IRL	Stephen McPhail (Vice-Captain)
11	MF	WAL	Paul Parry
12	DF	ENG	Roger Johnson
13	GK	ENG	Tom Heaton (on loan from Manchester United)
14	FW	GHA	Quincy Owusu-Abeyie (on loan from Spartak Moscow)
15	DF	FRA	Miguel Comminges

No.	Pos.	Nation	Player
16	MF	WAL	Joe Ledley (Vice-Captain)
17	DF	IRL	Darren Dennehy
18	FW	ENG	Michael Chopra (on loan from Sunderland)
19	MF	ENG	Riccardo Scimeca
20	GK	ENG	Stuart Taylor (on loan from Aston Villa)
21	MF	IRL	Mark Kennedy
22	GK	GRE	Dimitrios Konstantopoulos (on loan from Coventry City)
23	DF	WAL	Darcy Blake
25	GK	POL	Erwin Sak
26	MF	WAL	Jonathan Brown
29	MF	SCO	Chris Burke
31	DF	WAL	Adam Matthews
32	DF	WAL	Aaron Morris
44	FW	SCO	Ross McCormack

=== Detailed Overview ===
No.	Name	Place of birth	Date of birth	Club apps.	Club goals	Int. caps	Int. goals	Previous club	Date joined	Fee	End^{1}
1	Peter Enckelman	Turku	10 March 1977	20	0	12	0	Blackburn Rovers	18 July 2008	Free	2010
2	Kevin McNaughton	Dundee	28 August 1982	87	3	4	0	Aberdeen	26 May 2006	Free	2011
3	Tony Capaldi	Porsgrunn	12 August 1981	54	0	21	0	Plymouth Argyle	25 May 2007	Free	2010
4	Gavin Rae	Aberdeen	28 November 1977	55	4	14	0	Rangers	23 June 2007	Free	2010
5	Darren Purse	Stepney	14 February 1977	99	12	–	–	West Bromwich Albion	28 July 2005	£1,000,000	2009
6	Gábor Gyepes	Budapest	26 June 1981	–	–	23	1	Northampton Town	19 August 2008	£200,000	2013
7	Peter Whittingham	Nuneaton	8 September 1984	70	13	–	–	Aston Villa	11 January 2007	£350,000	2011
8	Jay Bothroyd	London	5 May 1982	–	–	–	–	Wolverhampton Wanderers	4 August 2008	£350,000	2011
9	Eddie Johnson	Bunnell	31 March 1984	–	–	42	12	Fulham	22 August 2008	Loan	2009
10	Stephen McPhail	London	9 December 1979	97	3	10	1	Barnsley	13 June 2006	Free	2011
11	Paul Parry	Chepstow	19 August 1980	168	23	12	1	Hereford United	9 January 2004	£75,000	2011
12	Roger Johnson	Ashford	28 April 1987	85	9	–	–	Wycombe Wanderers	4 July 2006	£275,000	2012
13	Tom Heaton	Chester	15 April 1986	–	–	–	–	Manchester United	23 May 2008	Loan	2009
14	Quincy Owusu-Abeyie	Amsterdam	15 April 1986	–	–	5	1	Spartak Moscow	31 January 2009	Loan	2009
15	Miguel Comminges	Les Abymes	16 March 1982	–	–	5	0	Swindon Town	1 May 2007	Free	2010
16	Joe Ledley	Cardiff	23 January 1987	174	21	16	1	N/A	1 June 2004	Trainee	2010
17	Darren Dennehy	County Kerry	21 September 1988	–	–	–	–	Everton	28 June 2008	Free	2010
18	Michael Chopra	Newcastle upon Tyne	23 December 1983	44	22	–	–	Sunderland	6 November 2008	Loan	2009
19	Riccardo Scimeca	Leamington Spa	13 June 1975	66	6	–	–	West Bromwich Albion	13 January 2006	Free	2009
20	Stuart Taylor	Romford	28 November 1980	–	–	–	–	Aston Villa	13 March 2009	Loan	2009
21	Mark Kennedy	Dublin	15 May 1976	–	–	34	4	Crystal Palace	10 July 2008	Free	2010
22	Dimitrios Konstantopoulos	Thessaloniki	29 November 1978	–	–	–	–	Coventry City	9 February 2009	Loan	2009
23	Darcy Blake	New Tredegar	13 December 1988	27	0	–	–	N/A	8 November 2006	Trainee	2011
25	Erwin Sak	Lublin	15 February 1990	–	–	–	–	Sokół Pniewy	19 February 2008	Free	2009
26	Jonathan Brown	Bridgend	17 April 1990	4	1	–	–	N/A	1 June 2007	Trainee	2009
29	Chris Burke	Glasgow	2 December 1983	–	–	2	2	Rangers	9 January 2009	Free	2011
31	Adam Matthews	Swansea	13 January 1992	–	–	–	–	N/A	14 January 2009	Trainee	2011
32	Aaron Morris	Cardiff	30 December 1989	2	0	–	–	N/A	1 June 2007	Trainee	2010
44	Ross McCormack	Glasgow	18 August 1986	–	–	1	0	Motherwell	28 June 2008	£110,000	2010

== Squad statistics ==
No.	Pos	Nat	Player	Total		Championship		FA Cup		League Cup	
No.	Pos	Nat	Player	Apps	Goals	Apps	Goals	Apps	Goals	Apps	Goals
1	GK	(Finland) FIN	Peter Enckelman	15	0	12	0	2	0	1	0
2	DF	(Scotland) SCO	Kevin McNaughton	44	0	39	0	3	0	2	0
3	DF	(Northern Ireland) NIR	Tony Capaldi	5	0	3	0	1	0	1	0
4	MF	(Scotland) SCO	Gavin Rae	46	1	41	1	3	0	2	0
5	DF	(England) ENG	Darren Purse	26	0	23	0	1	0	2	0
6	DF	(Netherlands) NED	Glenn Loovens*	2	0	1	0	0	0	1	0
6	DF	(Hungary) HUN	Gábor Gyepes	29	2	27	2	2	0	0	0
7	MF	(England) ENG	Peter Whittingham	38	4	33	3	2	0	3	1
8	FW	(England) ENG	Jay Bothroyd	44	12	39	12	3	0	2	0
9	FW	(United States) USA	Eddie Johnson	33	2	30	2	1	0	2	0
10	MF	(Republic of Ireland) IRL	Stephen McPhail	36	0	32	0	1	0	3	0
11	MF	(Wales) WAL	Paul Parry	46	4	40	2	3	0	3	2
12	DF	(England) ENG	Roger Johnson	51	5	45	5	3	0	3	0
13	GK	(England) ENG	Tom Heaton	24	0	21	0	1	0	2	0
14	MF	(England) ENG	Wayne Routledge*	9	2	9	2	0	0	0	0
14	MF	(Ghana) GHA	Quincy Owusu-Abeyie	4	0	4	0	0	0	0	0
15	DF	(France) FRA	Miguel Comminges	33	0	30	0	0	0	3	0
16	MF	(Wales) WAL	Joe Ledley	46	5	40	4	3	1	3	0
17	DF	(Republic of Ireland) IRL	Darren Dennehy	0	0	0	0	0	0	0	0
18	FW	(England) ENG	Michael Chopra	27	9	27	9	0	0	0	0
19	MF	(England) ENG	Riccardo Scimeca	6	0	4	0	1	0	1	0
20	FW	(Scotland) SCO	Steve Thompson*	5	1	4	1	0	0	1	0
20	GK	(England) ENG	Stuart Taylor	8	0	8	0	0	0	0	0
21	MF	(Republic of Ireland) IRL	Mark Kennedy	40	0	36	0	3	0	1	0
22	GK	(Greece) GRE	Dimitrios Konstantopoulos	6	0	6	0	0	0	0	0
23	MF	(Wales) WAL	Darcy Blake	9	0	7	0	1	0	1	0
25	GK	(Poland) POL	Erwin Sak	0	0	0	0	0	0	0	0
26	FW	(Wales) WAL	Jonathan Brown	0	0	0	0	0	0	0	0
29	MF	(Scotland) SCO	Chris Burke	16	1	14	1	2	0	0	0
31	DF	(Wales) WAL	Adam Matthews	0	0	0	0	0	0	0	0
32	DF	(Wales) WAL	Aaron Morris	1	0	0	0	0	0	1	0
44	FW	(Scotland) SCO	Ross McCormack	44	23	38	21	3	1	3	1

- * Indicates player left club during the season.

=== Disciplinary record ===
Number	Pos	Player	Yellow card	Red card
4	MF	Gavin Rae	6	0
8	FW	Jay Bothroyd	5	0
15	DF	Miguel Comminges	4	1
12	DF	Roger Johnson	4	0
16	MF	Joe Ledley	3	0
10	MF	Stephen McPhail	2	2
6	DF	Gábor Gyepes	2	1
44	FW	Ross McCormack	2	1
5	DF	Darren Purse	2	1
18	FW	Michael Chopra	2	0
21	MF	Mark Kennedy	2	0
2	DF	Kevin McNaughton	2	0
14	MF	Wayne Routledge	2	0
7	MF	Peter Whittingham	2	0
9	FW	Eddie Johnson	1	0
6	DF	Glenn Loovens	1	0

=== Contracts ===
No.	Pos.	Nat.	Name	Age	Status	Contract length	Expiry date	Source
12	DF	(England)	Johnson	26	Signed	3 years	2011	BBC Sport
6	DF	(Netherlands)	Loovens	25	Rejected	2 years	2010	BBC Sport
11	MF	(Wales)	Parry	28	Signed	2 years	2010	BBC Sport
19	MF	(England)	Scimeca	34	Signed	1 year	2009	BBC Sport
7	MF	(England)	Whittingham	24	Signed	3 years	2011	BBC Sport
2	DF	(Scotland)	McNaughton	26	Signed	3 years	2011	BBC Sport
6	DF	(Hungary)	Gyepes	27	Signed	3 years	2013	BBC Sport

== Transfers ==
=== In ===
No.	Pos.	Nat.	Name	Age	EU	Moving from	Type	Transfer window	Ends	Transfer fee	Source
15	DF	(Guadeloupe)	Comminges	26	EU	Swindon Town (England)	Free Transfer	Summer	2010	Free	BBC Sport
21	MF	(Republic of Ireland)	Kennedy	32	EU	Crystal Palace (England)	Free Transfer	Summer	2010	Free	BBC Sport
1	GK	(Finland)	Enckelman	31	EU	Blackburn Rovers (England)	Free Transfer	Summer	2010	Free	BBC Sport
17	DF	(Republic of Ireland)	Dennehy	19	EU	Everton (England)	Free Transfer	Summer	2010	Free	BBC Sport
44	FW	(Scotland)	McCormack	21	EU	Motherwell (Scotland)	Transfer	Summer	2010	£120,000	BBC Sport
8	FW	(England)	Bothroyd	26	EU	Wolverhampton Wanderers (England)	Transfer	Summer	2011	£350,000	BBC Sport
6	DF	(Hungary)	Gyepes	27	EU	Northampton Town (England)	Transfer	Summer	2010	£200,000	BBC Sport
29	MF	(Scotland)	Burke	25	EU	Rangers (Scotland)	Free Transfer	Winter	2011	Free	BBC Sport

=== Loans in ===
No.	Pos.	Name	Country	Age	Loan club	Started	Ended	Start source	End source
13	GK	Heaton	(England)	23	Manchester United	5 May	30 June	BBC Sport	South Wales Echo
9	FW	E Johnson	(United States)	25	Fulham	22 August	30 June	BBC Sport	South Wales Echo
18	FW	Chopra	(England)	25	Sunderland	6 November	30 December	BBC Sport	BBC Sport
14	MF	Routledge	(England)	23	Aston Villa	20 November	2 January	Cardiff City	BBC Sport
14	MF	Owusu-Abeyie	(Ghana)	23	Spartak Moscow	31 January	30 June	BBC Sport	South Wales Echo
18	FW	Chopra	(England)	25	Sunderland	2 February	30 June	BBC Sport	South Wales Echo
22	GK	Konstantopoulos	(Greece)	30	Coventry City	9 February	30 June	BBC Sport	South Wales Echo
20	GK	Taylor	(England)	28	Aston Villa	13 March	30 June	BBC Sport	South Wales Echo

Sources: For loan start source see "Start source". For loan end source see "End source".
EU = if holds or not a European Union passport; Country: when 2 flags, 1st flag = country that plays for internationally, 2nd flag = country of birth; No. = number on jersey; P = Position (for position name, pause mouse pointer on abbreviation); Name = Name on jersey (for more extensive name, pause mouse pointer on name); In/Out = In: The player came in on loan, Out: The player went out on loan; Loan club = the club that the player moved on loan to or the club that the player came from on loan; Started = the date when the player's loan started; Ended = the date when the player's loan ended.

=== Outs ===
No.	Pos.	Name	Country	Age	Type	Moving to	Transfer window	Transfer fee	Apps	Goals	Source
15	GK	Forde	(Republic of Ireland)	28	Free Transfer	Millwall (England)	Summer	Free	7	0	BBC Sport
8	FW	Fowler	(England)	33	Free Transfer	Blackburn Rovers (England)	Summer	Free	16	6	BBC Sport
27	FW	Green	(England)	21	Free Transfer	Torquay United (England)	Summer	Free	7	0	BBC Sport
36	FW	Hasselbaink	(Netherlands)	36	Retired		Summer	N/A	44	9	
6	DF	Loovens	(Netherlands)	24	Transfer	Celtic (Scotland)	Summer	£2,500,000	113	7	BBC Sport
13	GK	Oakes	(England)	34	Retired		Summer	N/A	15	0	BBC Sport
30	MF	Ramsey	(Wales)	17	Transfer	Arsenal (England)	Summer	£4,800,000	22	3	BBC Sport
17	MF	Sinclair	(England)	35	Retired		Summer	N/A	26	2	BBC Sport
28	DF	Smith	(Wales)	18	Free Transfer	Newport County (England)	Summer	Free	0	0	
20	FW	Thompson	(Scotland)	29	Free Transfer	Burnley (England)	Summer	Free	106	17	South Wales Echo
	MF	Flood	(Republic of Ireland)	23	Transfer	Celtic (Scotland)	Winter	Undisclosed	29	1	BBC Sport

EU = if holds or not a European Union passport; Country: when 2 flags, 1st flag = country that plays for internationally, 2nd flag = country of birth; N = number on jersey; P = Position (for position name, pause mouse pointer on abbreviation); Name = Name on jersey (for more extensive name, pause mouse pointer on name); Age = age on the day of the signing; Moving from = only indicate the club the player was playing before start playing for this club in this season, for the type of the moving see Status column; Moving to = only indicates the club the player is going to play next, for the type of the moving see Status column; Ends = when the player's current contract ends; n/a = Not applicable; Apps = Total number of competitive appearances (including substitute appearances) at the club prior to departure; Goals = Total number of competitive goals scored at the club prior to departure.

=== Loans Out ===
No.	Pos.	Name	Country	Age	Loan club	Started	Ended	Start source	End source
	MF	Flood	(Republic of Ireland)	23	Dundee United	2 July	30 January	BBC Sport	BBC Sport
	FW	Feeney	(Northern Ireland)	28	Dundee United	7 July	19 May	BBC Sport	[ Evening Telegraph]
25	GK	Sak	(Poland)	18	Newport County	2 September	2 October	ENews	
26	MF	Brown	(Wales)	18	Wrexham	25 November	3 February	BBC Sport	South Wales Echo
17	DF	Dennehy	(Republic of Ireland)	20	Hereford United	13 March	13 April	Hereford United	Hereford Times

Sources: For loan start source see "Start source". For loan end source see "End source".
EU = if holds or not a European Union passport; Country: when 2 flags, 1st flag = country that plays for internationally, 2nd flag = country of birth; No. = number on jersey; P = Position (for position name, pause mouse pointer on abbreviation); Name = Name on jersey (for more extensive name, pause mouse pointer on name); In/Out = In: The player came in on loan, Out: The player went out on loan; Loan club = the club that the player moved on loan to or the club that the player came from on loan; Started = the date when the player's loan started; Ended = the date when the player's loan ended.

== Fixtures & results ==
=== Results by round ===
Round	1	2	3	4	5	6	7	8	9	10	11	12	13	14	15	16	17	18	19	20	21	22	23	24	25	26	27	28	29	30	31	32	33	34	35	36	37	38	39	40	41	42	43	44	45	46
Ground	H	A	H	A	H	A	A	H	H	A	H	A	A	H	H	A	H	A	H	A	H	A	A	H	A	H	A	A	H	A	H	A	H	H	A	A	H	H	H	H	A	H	A	A	H	A
Result	W	D	D	D	D	W	D	L	W	D	W	D	W	W	L	L	W	L	D	D	W	D	W	W	D	W	D	W	W	D	D	L	W	W	L	D	W	L	D	W	W	W	L	D	L	L
Position		6	10	12	8		7	11		7	4		4		6	6	6	6		7	5		5	5	5	4	6		4	6		7		4		6		6	6		4	4	4		5	7

A = Away; H = Home; W = Win; D = Draw; L = Loss

=== Pre-season friendlies ===
Date	Opponent	Venue	Result	Attendance	Scorers
12 Jul	Merthyr Tydfil (Southern Premier Division)	A	W 3 – 1	–	Brown, Thompson, Taylor
12 Jul	Carmarthen Town (Welsh Premier League)	A	W 5 – 0	–	Parry (3), Kelleher, OG
19 Jul	Vitoria de Setubal (Portuguese Liga)	A	D 1 – 1	–	Thompson
22 Jul	Vitória de Guimarães (Portuguese Liga)	A	W 2 – 1	–	McCormack (2)
24 Jul	Celtic (Scottish Premier League)	N	W 1 – 0	–	Ledley
29 Jul	Swindon Town (Football League One)	A	D 1 – 1	–	Parry
1 Aug	Ajax (Dutch Eredivisie)	H	D 0 – 0	–	
5 Aug	Chasetown (Southern Football League Division One Midlands)	A	D 2 – 2	–	Parry, Oruma

=== Championship ===
9 August 1	Cardiff City	2–1	Southampton	Cardiff
15:00	Thompson 41'; R Johnson 90+1'	Report	45' McGoldrick	Stadium: Ninian Park; Attendance: 19,749; Referee: Scott Mathieson

16 August 2	Doncaster Rovers	1–1	Cardiff City	Doncaster
15:00	Guy 67'	Report	88' McCormack	Stadium: Keepmoat Stadium; Attendance: 11,873; Referee: Mark Halsey

23 August 3	Cardiff City	2–2	Norwich City	Cardiff
15:00	McCormack 3', 67' (pen.)	Report	77', 81' Lupoli	Stadium: Ninian Park; Attendance: 18,032; Referee: Anthony Taylor

30 August 4	Sheffield United	0–0	Cardiff City	Sheffield
15:00		Report		Stadium: Bramall Lane; Attendance: 29,226; Referee: Colin Webster

13 September 5	Cardiff City	0–0	Bristol City	Cardiff
15:00		Report		Stadium: Ninian Park; Attendance: 19,312; Referee: Peter Walton

16 September 6	Barnsley	0–1	Cardiff City	Barnsley
19:45		Report	14' Whittingham	Stadium: Oakwell; Attendance: 11,282; Referee: Graham Laws

20 September 7	Derby County	1–1	Cardiff City	Derby
15:00	Albrechtsen 30'	Report	69' (pen.) McCormack	Stadium: Pride Park Stadium; Attendance: 28,007; Referee: Mark Haywood

27 September 8	Cardiff City	1–2	Birmingham City	Cardiff
15:00	McCormack 86'	Report	5' McFadden; 41' Owusu-Abeyie	Stadium: Ninian Park; Attendance: 18,304; Referee: Mike Jones

30 September 9	Cardiff City	2–1	Coventry City	Cardiff
19:45	Bothroyd 31'; McCormack 85' (pen.)	Report	89' Dann	Stadium: Ninian Park; Attendance: 16,312; Referee: Roger East

4 October 10	Blackpool	1–1	Cardiff City	Blackpool
15:00	Gow 90+5'	Report	83' Parry	Stadium: Bloomfield Road; Attendance: 7,328; Referee: Nigel Miller

18 October 11	Cardiff City	2–0	Charlton Athletic	Cardiff
15:00	McCormack 18', 52'	Report		Stadium: Ninian Park; Attendance: 17,310; Referee: Kevin Friend

21 October 12	Watford	2–2	Cardiff City	Watford
19:45	O'Toole 2'; Hoskins 24'	Report	72', 75' Bothroyd	Stadium: Vicarage Road; Attendance: 13,461; Referee: Richard Beeby

25 October 13	Nottingham Forest	0–1	Cardiff City	Nottingham
15:00		Report	54' (pen.) McCormack	Stadium: City Ground; Attendance: 19,468; Referee: Keith Stroud

28 October 14	Cardiff City	2–0	Blackpool	Cardiff
19:45	Whittingham 83'; McCormack 86'	Report		Stadium: Ninian Park; Attendance: 17,570; Referee: Rob Shoebridge

1 November 15	Cardiff City	1–2	Wolverhampton Wanderers	Cardiff
17:20	McCormack 19'	Report	4' Iwelumo; 8' Ebanks-Blake	Stadium: Ninian Park; Attendance: 17,734; Referee: Stephen Tanner

8 November 16	Queens Park Rangers	1–0	Cardiff City	London
15:00	Mahon 80'	Report		Stadium: Loftus Road; Attendance: 13,347; Referee: Lee Probert

15 November 17	Cardiff City	2–1	Crystal Palace	Cardiff
15:00	Chopra 33' (pen.); Ledley 53'	Report	37' Scannell	Stadium: Ninian Park; Attendance: 17,478; Referee: Jonathan Moss

22 November 18	Plymouth Argyle	2–1	Cardiff City	Plymouth
12:45	Mpenza 39'; Gallagher 41'	Report	62' Chopra	Stadium: Home Park; Attendance: 11,438; Referee: Paul Taylor

25 November 19	Cardiff City	2–2	Reading	Cardiff
19:45	Routledge 10'; McCormack 41' (pen.)	Report	16' Doyle; 50' Gunnarsson	Stadium: Ninian Park; Attendance: 17,514; Referee: Peter Walton

30 November 20	Swansea City	2–2	Cardiff City	Swansea
11:15	Pratley 19'; Pintado 61'	Report	45' Ledley; 48' (pen.) McCormack	Stadium: Liberty Stadium; Attendance: 18,053; Referee: Martin Atkinson

6 December 21	Cardiff City	2–0	Preston North End	Cardiff
15:00	R Johnson 42'; Chopra 76' (pen.)	Report		Stadium: Ninian Park; Attendance: 16,560; Referee: Andy D'Urso

9 December 22	Burnley	2–2	Cardiff City	Burnley
19:45	Blake 14'; Thompson 76'	Report	26' Bothroyd; 47' Routledge	Stadium: Turf Moor; Attendance: 11,230; Referee: Colin Webster

13 December 23	Ipswich Town	1–2	Cardiff City	Ipswich
15:00	Stead 42'	Report	9' Bothroyd; 26' Gyepes	Stadium: Portman Road; Attendance: 19,665; Referee: Andy Woolmer

20 December 24	Cardiff City	2–0	Sheffield Wednesday	Cardiff
15:00	Johnson 49'; Chopra 65' (pen.)	Report		Stadium: Ninian Park; Attendance: 17,600; Referee: Kevin Friend

26 December 25	Reading	1–1	Cardiff City	Reading
15:00	Federici 90+6'	Report	89' Chopra	Stadium: Madjeski Stadium; Attendance: 22,770; Referee: Andy Hall

28 December 26	Cardiff City	1–0	Plymouth Argyle	Cardiff
15:00	Bothroyd 81'	Report		Stadium: Ninian Park; Attendance: 19,145; Referee: Stuart Attwell

17 January 27	Birmingham City	1–1	Cardiff City	Birmingham
15:00	Bowyer 90+4'	Report	61' Ledley	Stadium: St Andrew's; Attendance: 19,853; Referee: Mike Jones

28 January 28	Coventry City	0–2	Cardiff City	Coventry
19:45		Report	34' Bothroyd; 61' McCormack	Stadium: Ricoh Arena; Attendance: 14,922; Referee: Anthony Bates

31 January 29	Cardiff City	2–0	Nottingham Forest	Cardiff
15:00	Parry 18'; Bothroyd 87'	Report		Stadium: Ninian Park; Attendance: 18,779; Referee: Grant Hegley

22 February 30	Wolverhampton Wanderers	2–2	Cardiff City	Wolverhampton
15:00	Ebanks-Blake 11'; Konstantopoulos 81' (o.g.)	Report	31' Chopra; 48' R Johnson	Stadium: Molineux Stadium; Attendance: 22,093; Referee: Darren Deadman

25 February 31	Cardiff City	0–0	Queens Park Rangers	Cardiff
19:45		Report		Stadium: Ninian Park; Attendance: 17,340; Referee: Roger East

28 February 32	Southampton	1–0	Cardiff City	Southampton
15:00	McGoldrick 11' (pen.)	Report		Stadium: St Mary's Stadium; Attendance: 18,526; Referee: Kevin Wright

3 March 33	Cardiff City	3–1	Barnsley	Cardiff
19:45	Ledley 4'; Chopra 43'; Whittingham 88'	Report	88' Macken	Stadium: Ninian Park; Attendance: 15,902; Referee: Pat Miller

7 March 34	Cardiff City	3–0	Doncaster Rovers	Cardiff
15:00	Chopra 10'; Bothroyd 29'; E Johnson 60'	Report		Stadium: Ninian Park; Attendance: 17,821; Referee: Grant Hegley

10 March 35	Norwich City	2–0	Cardiff City	Norwich
19:45	Mooney 49'; McDonald 90+1'	Report		Stadium: Carrow Road; Attendance: 23,706; Referee: Trevor Kettle

15 March 36	Bristol City	1–1	Cardiff City	Bristol
13:15	Maynard 71'	Report	88' McCormack	Stadium: Ashton Gate Stadium; Attendance: 17,487; Referee: Lee Mason

18 March 37	Cardiff City	2–1	Watford	Cardiff
19:45	Bothroyd 14'; McCormack 90+7' (pen.)	Report	10' (pen.) Smith	Stadium: Ninian Park; Attendance: 17,899; Referee: Andy Hall

22 March 38	Cardiff City	0–3	Sheffield United	Cardiff
15:00		Report	25' (pen.) Cotterill; 46' Ward; 87' Quinn	Stadium: Ninian Park; Attendance: 17,942; Referee: Paul Taylor

5 April 39	Cardiff City	2–2	Swansea City	Cardiff
11:00	Chopra 54'; McCormack 90+1' (pen.)	Report	11' Dyer; 88' Allen	Stadium: Ninian Park; Attendance: 20,156; Referee: Mike Dean

8 April 40	Cardiff City	4–1	Derby County	Cardiff
19:45	R Johnson 16'; Rae 61'; Bothroyd 63'; E Johnson 79'	Report	90+2' (o.g.) E Johnson	Stadium: Ninian Park; Attendance: 18,403; Referee: Neil Swarbrick

11 April 41	Crystal Palace	0–2	Cardiff City	London
15:00		Report	22' (pen.), 90+2' McCormack	Stadium: Selhurst Park; Attendance: 14,814; Referee: Russell Booth

13 April 42	Cardiff City	3–1	Burnley	Cardiff
15:00	Bothroyd 74'; McCormack 85', 90+3'	Report	84' Blake	Stadium: Ninian Park; Attendance: 19,379; Referee: Lee Probert

18 April 43	Preston North End	6–0	Cardiff City	Preston
15:00	Mellor 17', 41'; Parkin 51'; Kennedy 54' (o.g.); Brown 75'; Williamson 86'	Report		Stadium: Deepdale; Attendance: 13,692; Referee: Keith Stroud

21 April 44	Charlton Athletic	2–2	Cardiff City	London
19:45	Shelvey 35'; Bailey 80'	Report	82' Burke; 89' Gyepes	Stadium: The Valley; Attendance: 19,390; Referee: Iain Williamson

25 April 45	Cardiff City	0–3	Ipswich Town	Cardiff
15:00		Report	34' Couñago; 51' Norris; 90' Stead	Stadium: Ninian Park; Attendance: 19,129; Referee: Scott Mathieson

3 May 46	Sheffield Wednesday	1–0	Cardiff City	Sheffield
13:15	Johnson 71'	Report		Stadium: Hillsborough Stadium; Attendance: 30,658; Referee: Phil Crossley

=== League Cup ===
12 August 1st Round	Bournemouth	1–2	Cardiff City	Bournemouth
19:45	Kuffour 28'		7', 12' Parry	Stadium: Seward Stadium; Attendance: 3,399; Referee: Graham Horwood

26 August 2nd Round	Cardiff City	2–1	Milton Keynes Dons	Cardiff
19:45	McCormack 45+3' (pen.); Whittingham 58'		75' Hanlon	Stadium: Ninian Park; Attendance: 6,334; Referee: Rob Shoebridge

23 September 3rd Round	Swansea City	1–0	Cardiff City	Swansea
19:45	Gómez 57'			Stadium: Liberty Stadium; Attendance: 17,411; Referee: Alan Wiley

=== FA Cup ===
3 January 3rd Round	Cardiff City	2–0	Reading	Cardiff
15:00	McCormack 57'; Ledley 83'			Stadium: Ninian Park; Attendance: 12,448; Referee: Anthony Taylor

25 January 4th Round	Cardiff City	0–0	Arsenal	Cardiff
13:30				Stadium: Ninian Park; Attendance: 20,079; Referee: Martin Atkinson

16 February 4th Round replay	Arsenal	4–0	Cardiff City	London
19:45	Eduardo 20', 64' (pen.); Bendtner 34' van Persie 89'			Stadium: Emirates Stadium; Attendance: 57,237; Referee: Mark Halsey

== Overall summary ==
Games Played	52 (46 Championship, 3 FA Cup, 3 League Cup)
Games Won	24 (19 Championship, 1 FA Cup, 2 League Cup)
Games Drawn	18 (17 Championship, 1 FA Cup, 0 League Cup)
Games Lost	12 (10 Championship, 1 FA Cup, 1 League Cup)
Goals Scored	71 (65 Championship, 4 FA Cup, 2 League Cup)
Goals conceded	60 (53 Championship, 3 FA Cup, 4 League Cup)
Goal Difference	+11
Clean Sheets	15 (14 Championship, 1 FA Cup, 0 League Cup)
Yellow Cards	42
Red Cards	5 (4 Championship, 0 FA Cup, 1 League Cup)
Worst Discipline	(Scotland) Gavin Rae (6 (yellow card) 0 (red card) )
Best Result	4–1 vs Derby County
Worst Result	0–6 vs Preston North End
Most Appearances	(England) Roger Johnson, 51 (45 Championship, 3 FA Cup, 3 League Cup)
Top Scorer	(Scotland) Ross McCormack, 23 (21 Championship, 1 FA Cup, 1 League Cup)
Points	74 / 132 (56.06%)

League Score Overview

Opposition	Home Score	Away Score	Double
Barnsley	3–1	1–0	Yes
Birmingham City	1–2	1–1	No
Blackpool	2–0	1–1	No
Bristol City	0–0	1–1	No
Burnley	3–1	2–2	No
Charlton Athletic	2–0	2–2	No
Coventry City	2–1	2–0	Yes
Crystal Palace	2–1	2–0	Yes
Derby County	4–1	1–1	No
Doncaster Rovers	3–0	1–1	No
Ipswich Town	0–3	2–1	No
Norwich City	0–2	2–2	No
Nottingham Forest	2–0	1–0	Yes
Plymouth Argyle	1–0	1–2	No
Preston North End	2–0	0–6	No
Queens Park Rangers	0–0	0–1	No
Reading	2–2	1–1	No
Sheffield United	0–3	0–0	No
Sheffield Wednesday	2–0	0–1	No
Southampton	2–1	0–1	No
Swansea City	2–2	2–2	No
Watford	2–1	2–2	No
Wolverhampton Wanderers	1–2	2–2	No

== Backroom staff ==
- Manager: Dave Jones
- Assistant manager: Terry Burton
- Reserve team manager: Paul Wilkinson
- Club doctor: Dr Leonard Noakes
- Club physio: Sean Connelly
- Fitness coach: Alex Armstrong
- Goalkeeping coach: Martyn Margetson
- Kit manager: Ian Lanning
- Performance analyst: Enda Barron
- Masseur: Steffan Burnett
- Academy manager: Neal Ardley

== Awards ==
=== Team ===
- Algarve Cup – Winners
- Welsh team of the year: Winners

=== Individual ===
- October Championship manager of the month: Dave Jones.
- Welsh Clubman of the Year: Joe Ledley
- January Championship player of the month: Joe Ledley

== See also ==
Cardiff City F.C. seasons
