= Erwin Sak =

Polish footballer

Personal information
- Full name: Erwin Sak
- Date of birth: 15 February 1990 (age 36)
- Place of birth: Lublin, Poland
- Height: 6 ft 0 in (1.83 m)
- Position: Goalkeeper

Youth career
- 2000–2005: LSP Legion Lublin
- 2005–2008: MSP Szamotuły

Senior career*
Years	Team	Apps	(Gls)
2006	Drawa Thule Krzyż Wlkp.	17	(0)
2006–2008	Sokół Pniewy	45	(0)
2008–2009	Cardiff City	0	(0)
2008	→ Newport County (loan)	1	(0)
2009	Wrexham	0	(0)
2010	Bug Wyszków	15	(0)
2011–2012	Stomil Olsztyn	3	(0)
2013	Nadnarwianka Pułtusk		
2013	Świt Nowy Dwór Mazowiecki	10	(0)
2014–2015	Mazur Karczew		
2016	Mazur Karczew		
2018	LZS Stara Kamienica		
- * Club domestic league appearances and goals

Erwin Sak (born 15 February 1990) is a Polish former professional footballer who played as a goalkeeper.

== Early career ==
Sak started his career with LSP Legion Lublin. At the age of 15, he moved to the best-known football academy in Poland, MSP Szamotuły, where, for two-and-a-half years, his talent was nurtured by Andrzej Dawidziuk, the former goalkeeping coach for the Poland national team.

== Club career ==
At 16 years old Sak began to play regularly in senior teams. In 2006, he joined Drawa Thule Krzyż Wlkp. After six months, he joined III liga club Sokół Pniewy until January 2008. He went on a one-week trial at Championship side Cardiff City and eventually signed for the club. On 19 February he was included in the first team for the first time when he was named as a substitute in the FAW Premier Cup semi-final against Newport County.

At the start of the 2008–09 season, Sak was named as the club's third choice goalkeeper for the forthcoming season behind Tom Heaton and Peter Enckelman. On 2 September 2008, Sak joined Dean Holdsworth's Newport County on a one-month loan to cover for the injured Glyn Thompson, playing once in a 2–0 defeat to Havant & Waterlooville. On 16 February 2009, Sak was named as a substitute in the fourth round of the FA Cup replay against Arsenal.

On 1 September 2009, Sak had his contract terminated. He subsequently joined Wrexham on non-contract terms.

== International career ==
He has been nominated for Polish junior national teams. He was called up in June 2007.
