= Tom Heaton =

English footballer (born 1986)

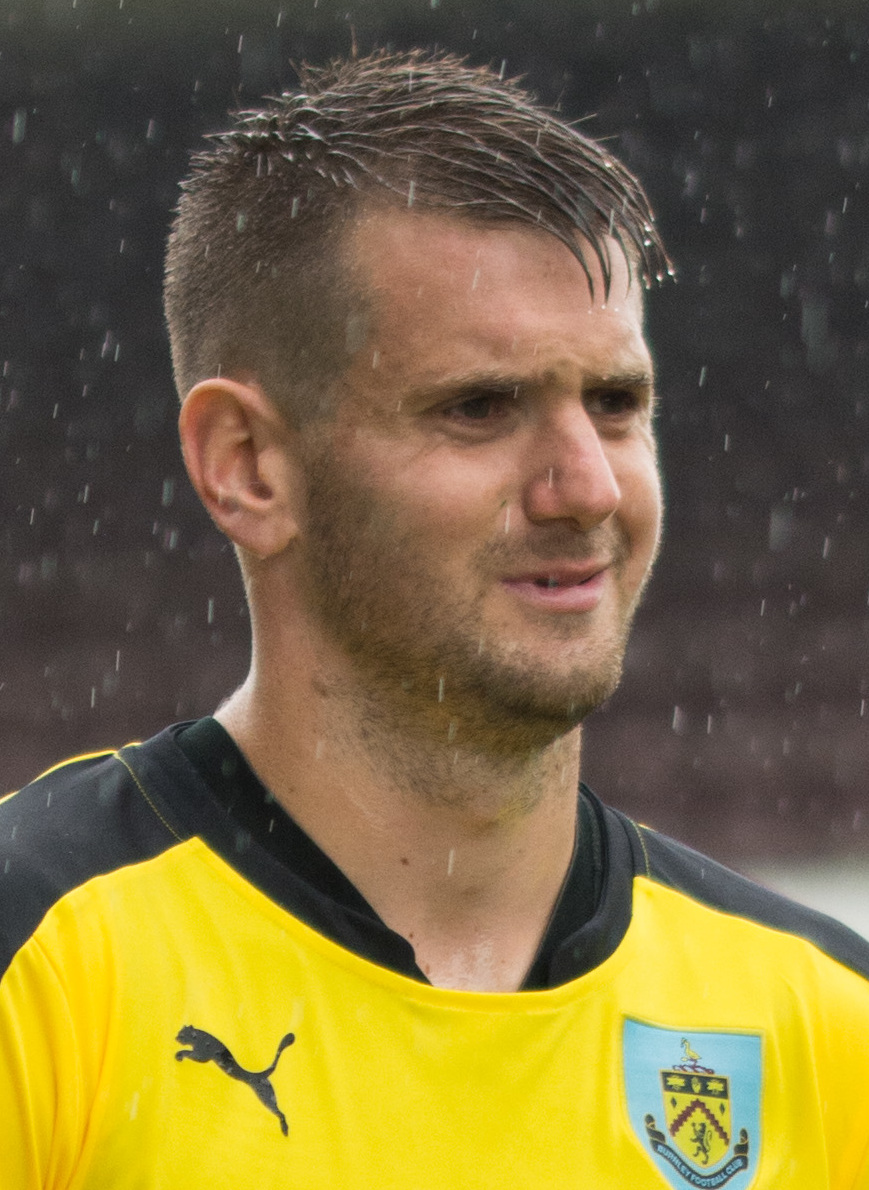
- Heaton playing for Burnley in 2015

Personal information
- Full name: Thomas David Heaton
- Date of birth: 15 April 1986 (age 40)
- Place of birth: Chester, England
- Height: 6 ft 2 in (1.88 m)
- Position: Goalkeeper

Team information
- Current team: Manchester United
- Number: 22

Youth career
- Wrexham
- 2002–2005: Manchester United

Senior career*
Years	Team	Apps	(Gls)
2005–2010	Manchester United	0	(0)
2005–2006	→ Swindon Town (loan)	14	(0)
2006	→ Royal Antwerp (loan)	0	(0)
2008–2009	→ Cardiff City (loan)	21	(0)
2009	→ Queens Park Rangers (loan)	0	(0)
2009–2010	→ Rochdale (loan)	12	(0)
2010	→ Wycombe Wanderers (loan)	16	(0)
2010–2012	Cardiff City	29	(0)
2012–2013	Bristol City	43	(0)
2013–2019	Burnley	188	(0)
2019–2021	Aston Villa	20	(0)
2021–	Manchester United	0	(0)

International career
2001	England U16	4	(0)
2002–2003	England U17	9	(0)
2004	England U18	2	(0)
2004	England U19	1	(0)
2008–2009	England U21	3	(0)
2016–2017	England	3	(0)
Medal record
Men's football
Representing England
UEFA Nations League
Third place	2019 Portugal
- * Club domestic league appearances and goals as of 13:34, 12 January 2023 (UTC)

Thomas David Heaton (born 15 April 1986) is an English professional footballer who plays as a goalkeeper for Premier League club Manchester United.

Heaton began his career in the Manchester United academy but was unable to break into the first team and spent time on loan with Swindon Town, Royal Antwerp, Cardiff City, Queens Park Rangers, Rochdale, and Wycombe Wanderers, before joining Cardiff permanently after his release by Manchester United in July 2010. He then joined Bristol City on a one-year deal with an option of a second year but turned it down in May 2013 in favour of a move to Burnley, where he remained for six years before joining Aston Villa in 2019. After two years with Aston Villa, he returned to Manchester United in July 2021.

Formerly an international from under-16 to under-21 level, Heaton has been involved in senior England squads since 2015, finally making his senior debut in a friendly match against Australia on 27 May 2016.

== Club career ==
=== Manchester United ===
Born in Chester, Cheshire, Heaton began his football career with Wrexham, for whom he played both in goal and in midfield, but, after making 20 appearances for the Manchester United Under-17 team in the previous two seasons, he signed for United as a trainee on 8 July 2002. He became a regular in the Under-17 team during the 2002–03 season, and picked up an FA Youth Cup winner's medal despite playing second fiddle to Luke Steele throughout the entire competition. He made his first appearance in the reserve team the following season, starting in a 3–1 home win over Birmingham City in the Premier Reserve League on 2 October 2003. At the end of the 2003–04 season, Heaton was named on the bench for the final of the Manchester Senior Cup against Manchester City, and won a winner's medal despite not taking the field.

By the 2004–05 season, Heaton had become the first-choice goalkeeper for the Manchester United reserve team, and was named on the bench for Stan Ternent's testimonial on 20 August 2004, coming on as a 76th-minute substitute for Luke Steele after Steele had earlier come on for Tim Howard. With Heaton in goal for 17 of the 28 Premier Reserve League North matches and 12 of the 22 Central League matches, the team went on to win both league titles by nine and five points respectively.

Heaton's form for the reserves resulted in him being loaned out to Swindon Town at the start of the 2005–06, initially until 1 January 2006. Heaton made his professional debut in a League Cup tie against Wycombe Wanderers, and in his second appearance against Yeovil Town in the league he saved a penalty from Lee Johnson. During his time at Swindon, he played over 20 matches, and was described as "one for the future" by manager Iffy Onuora. He returned to Manchester United, but, after the recall of Ritchie Jones from Royal Antwerp, Heaton was sent there for the rest of the season after United rebuffed an approach from Huddersfield Town.

Heaton spent the 2007–08 season with the first team-squad at Manchester United, appearing on the bench when Edwin van der Sar was out due to injury.

==== Cardiff City (loan) ====
At the end of the 2007–08 season, Heaton agreed to move to Championship club Cardiff City on loan for the duration of the 2008–09 season. He was chosen as the club's first choice goalkeeper, above Peter Enckelman, for the start of the season by manager Dave Jones. He played in every match until late November, with the exception of the League Cup third round tie against Swansea City, when he was replaced by Enckelman. However, late on in Cardiff's 2–1 away defeat to Plymouth Argyle on 22 November 2008, Heaton picked up an injury and was forced off. The injury would go on to cost Heaton his place in the team as the club went unbeaten with Enckelman in goal for over two months.

In February, Enckelman was forced to undergo knee surgery which saw Heaton return in goal on 16 February 2009, when he put up an impressive performance despite the 4–0 defeat at the hands of Arsenal. However, he tore his thigh muscle during the match, ruling him out for up to five weeks. On his return, Heaton found himself on the bench behind loanee Stuart Taylor but, following a 6–0 defeat against Preston North End, he replaced Taylor for the final three matches of the season. However, he was unable to keep Cardiff in the play-off places and he returned to Manchester United at the end of the season.

==== Queens Park Rangers (loan) ====
On 15 August 2009, Heaton was signed by Queens Park Rangers on an emergency three-month loan deal, the terms of which allowed him to compete in the League Cup. Heaton's loan spell ended on 8 November 2009. He made one first-team appearance during his loan, in the 1–0 defeat at Chelsea in the League Cup on 23 September 2009.

==== Rochdale (loan) ====
After returning from QPR, Heaton joined Rochdale on 13 November 2009 until the end of December 2009. He made his debut in a 3–2 loss against Chesterfield on 14 November 2009. The loan was then extended until 23 January 2010, before a further extension pushed the end date back to 31 January. In his 12 appearances for Rochdale, Heaton conceded only ten goals – including four clean sheets – and finished on the losing team just once.

==== Wycombe Wanderers (loan) ====
Heaton spent less than two weeks back at Manchester United before going back out on loan to Wycombe Wanderers on 12 February 2010. He went straight into the Wycombe starting line-up for their away match against Brentford the following day, which they drew 1–1. Heaton made his second appearance for the Chairboys in their 0–0 draw against Southampton on Tuesday 23 February 2010. He made a great save from a volley to keep the Chairboys on even terms with the Saints.

=== Return to Cardiff City ===
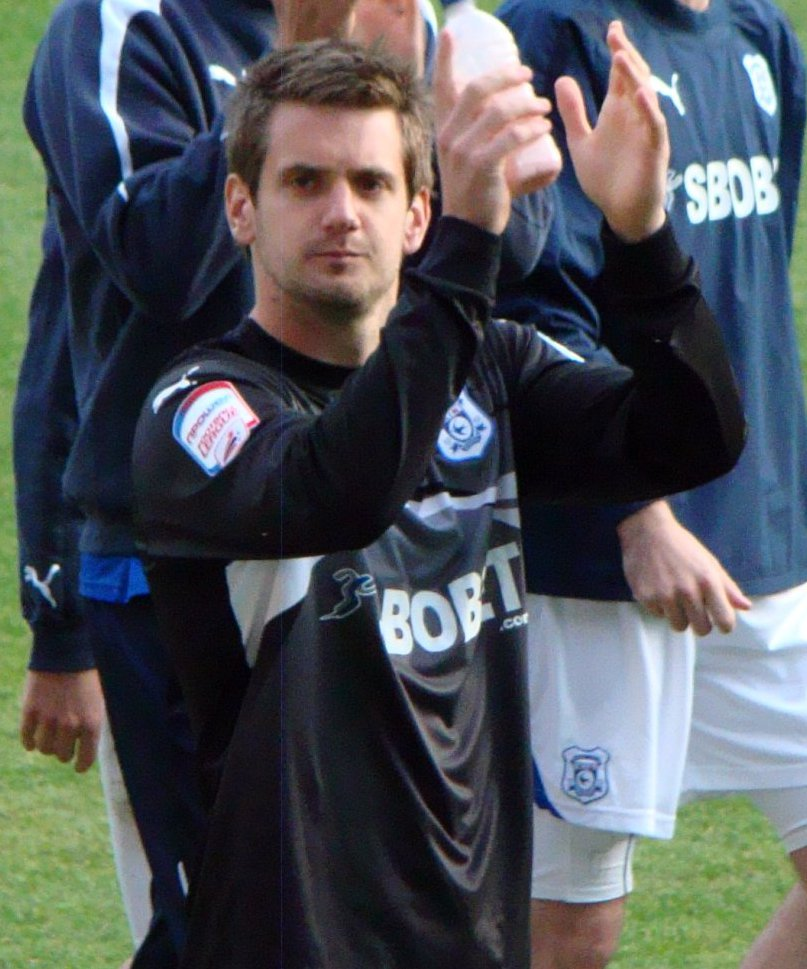
Heaton playing for Cardiff City in 2011

Meeting with Manchester United manager Sir Alex Ferguson on his future at the club amidst an expiring contract, Heaton declined an offer to stay at Old Trafford, deciding instead to leave on free transfer in pursuit of regular playing time. Following his release by United, Heaton agreed a deal on 15 June 2010 to return to Cardiff City on 1 July 2010. He made his second debut in 4–1 win over Burton Albion in the League Cup on 11 August. After first-choice goalkeeper David Marshall suffered an elbow injury, Heaton established himself as Cardiff's new number one starter. In late February, however, he suffered a groin injury, so Jason Brown and Stephen Bywater were brought in as cover on loan. Upon his return, Heaton went into the team against Derby County, where they won 4–1, their first win in four matches. Heaton's performances during the 2010–11 season earned him the club's Young Player of the Year award.

Under new manager, Malky Mackay, Heaton found himself as cover for David Marshall, but he played a key part in the club's League Cup run in which they reached the final thanks to two saves from Heaton in a semi-final penalty shoot-out against Crystal Palace. He suffered an ankle injury just before the final, but he overcame the injury to start at Wembley Stadium. Heaton followed his penalty heroics against Crystal Palace when he started the penalty shoot-out by pushing Steven Gerrard's effort onto the bar, but he ultimately ended up on the losing team as Liverpool won the shoot-out 3–2. Despite the successful cup run, Heaton still found himself second string to Marshall and was released at the end of the season after rejecting a new contract in the Welsh capital.

=== Bristol City ===
In July 2012, Heaton held talks with Watford over a potential move; however, Watford's new owners decided to pull out of the move. Later that month, Heaton went on trial with Bristol City during their pre-season training camp in Spain and they opened contract talks soon after. On 27 July, Heaton signed a one-year deal with the club, with the option for a further 12 months. He made his debut on 18 August 2012, in a 1–0 defeat away to Nottingham Forest. A disappointing season in Bristol led to the club owning the worst defensive record in the league with 84 goals allowed, and they were relegated at the end of the season. Heaton started 43 of Bristol City's 46 matches in the Championship that season, and was viewed as one of the club's best players that season.

=== Burnley ===
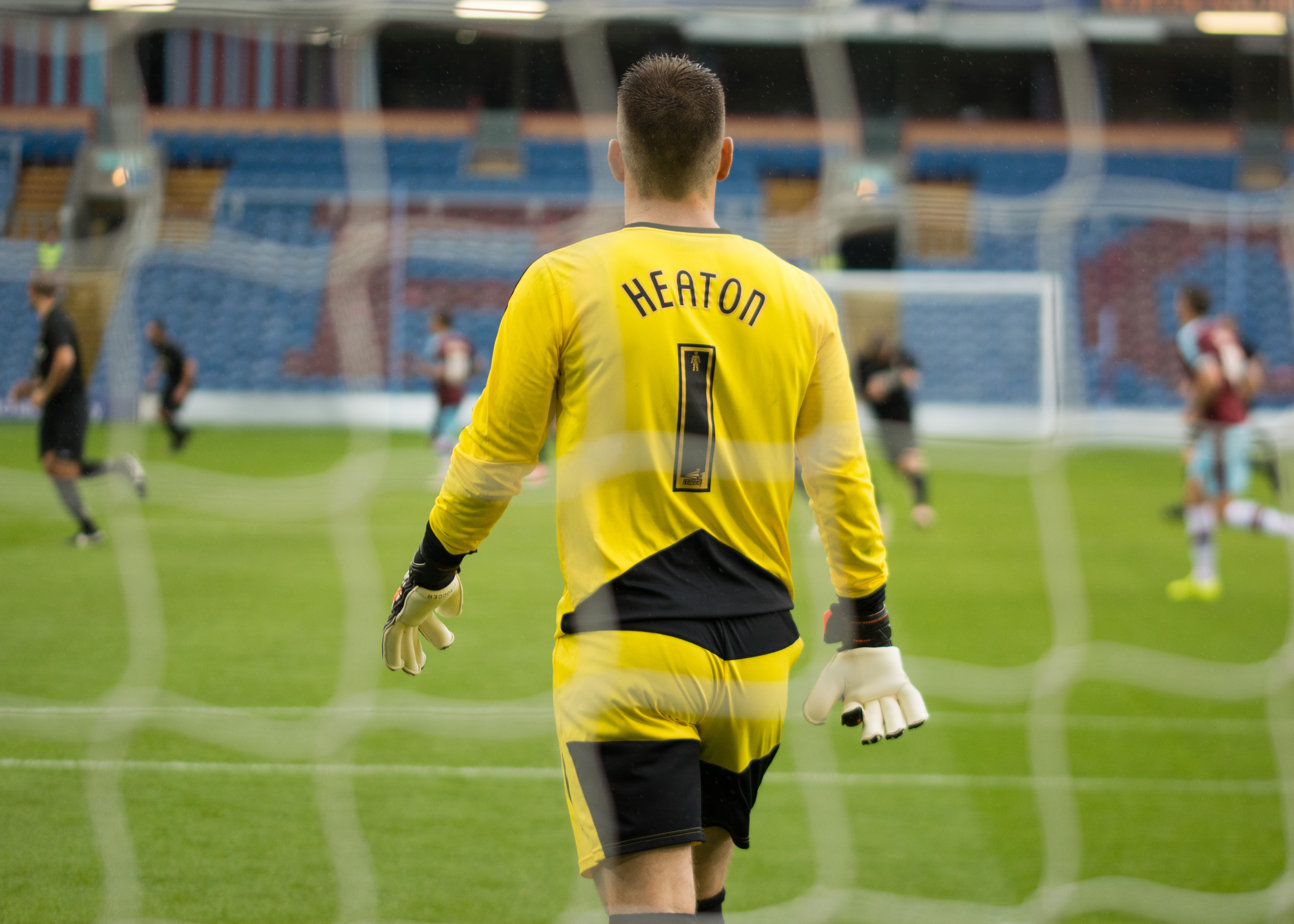
Heaton playing for Burnley in 2015

Heaton signed with Burnley in May 2013, joining them in July, after turning down a further one-year deal at Bristol City. He decided to stay in the Championship, and Burnley offered Heaton a two-year contract attaching him to the club until June 2015, with an option of a third year. A target of manager Sean Dyche while at Watford, Dyche's first Burnley signing was described as a "good technician" with a "great pedigree". Heaton immediately became the first-choice goalkeeper for Burnley following the departures of Lee Grant and Brian Jensen. He made his Burnley debut against Bolton Wanderers on 3 August 2013. On 24 August, he was the recipient of a rare technical caution (his second of the match) for handling the ball after releasing it whilst playing against Brighton, a match they lost 2–0. Heaton was a part of Burnley's defence that allowed only 37 goals, the fewest in the league, as Burnley returned to the Premier League for the first time since 2009–10. Heaton also picked up 19 clean sheets, the most by any keeper in the regular season.

Heaton made his Premier League debut on 18 August 2014 against Chelsea in a 3–1 loss. Heaton played in every minute of Burnley's Premier League campaign, the only goalkeeper in the league to do so, but his efforts would not be enough, as Burnley and their league-worst offence were relegated at the end of the season. After the season, Heaton was voted by his teammates as Burnley's Players' Player of the Year.

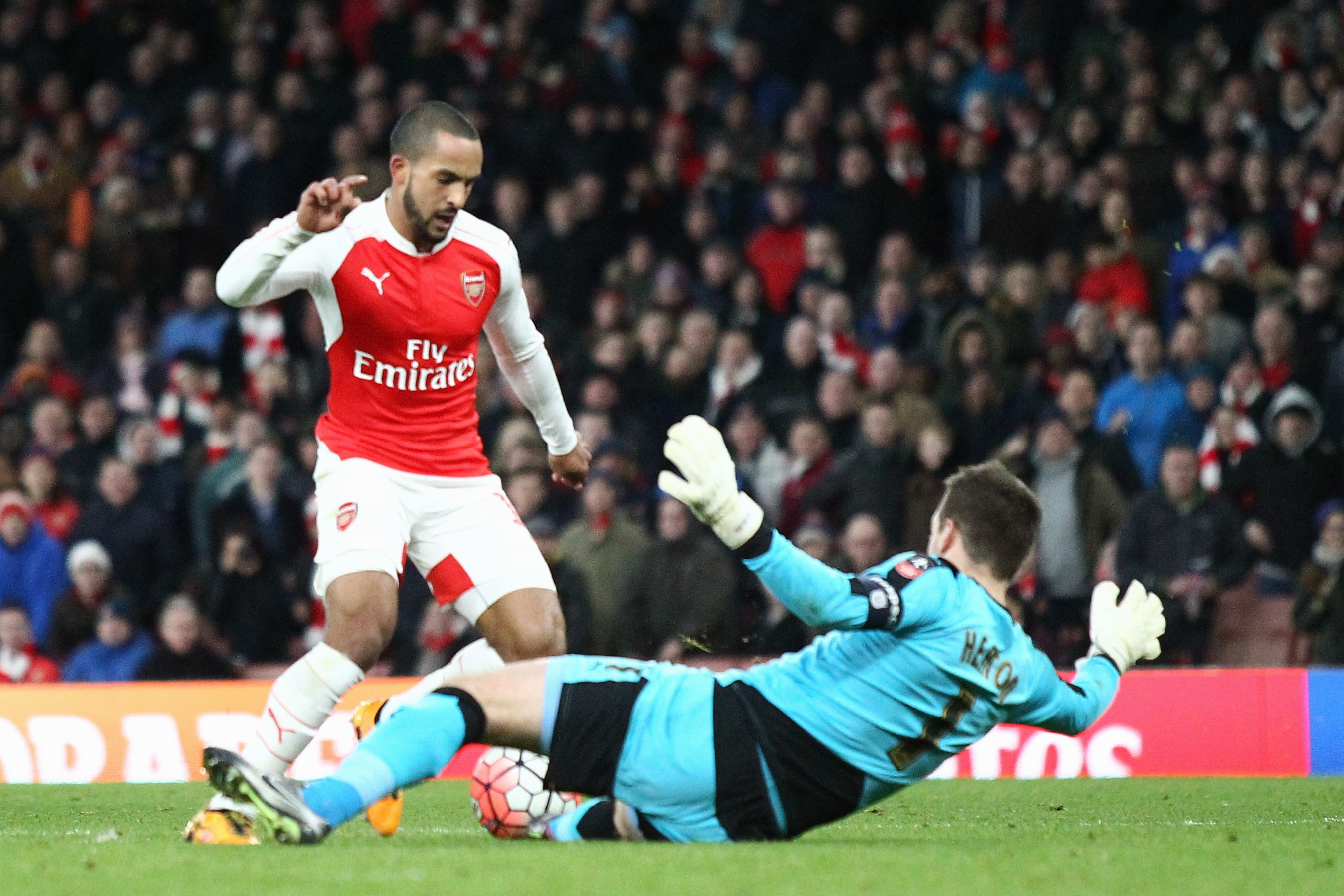
Heaton (right) playing for Burnley in 2016

On 30 June 2015, Heaton signed a new three-year deal at the club through to the summer of 2018. Taking over for Jason Shackell, Heaton was named as captain for the 2015–16 season, captaining the team for the first time on 8 August 2015, on the opening day of the 2015–16 Championship season against Leeds United in a 1–1 draw. Heaton kept 20 clean sheets during the season, second only to Dimitrios Konstantopoulos of Middlesbrough, as Burnley did not lose in the second half of the Championship season on their way to becoming champions and earning promotion back to the Premier League at their first attempt. Towards the end of the season, Heaton was named in the Championship PFA Team of the Year.

On 20 July 2016, Heaton signed another new contract, this time a four-year deal running until the summer of 2020. On 29 October, Heaton made numerous saves during the match against former club Manchester United, the highlight being a mid-air, fully extended save of Zlatan Ibrahimović that Heaton claimed "nearly broke [his] arm". Afterwards, Heaton required medical attention but remained in the match to lead Burnley to a 0–0 draw, being named Man of the Match in the process. In the same season on 22 January 2017, Heaton made his 150th league appearance for the club as he was beaten by a 97th-minute penalty from Alexis Sánchez that saw Arsenal win 2–1.

=== Aston Villa ===
The 33 year-old Heaton signed for newly promoted Premier League club Aston Villa on 1 August 2019 for an undisclosed fee, believed to be £8 million. On 1 January 2020, Heaton suffered a season-ending knee injury during a 2–1 win against his former team Burnley, a game which also saw his teammate Wesley suffer a similarly serious knee injury. On 13 January, Villa signed Pepe Reina on loan from AC Milan to cover Heaton for the rest of the 2019–20 season.

In September 2020, with Heaton still injured, Villa signed Emiliano Martínez from Arsenal as their new first choice goalkeeper. On 10 November 2020, after over ten months out, Heaton made his return to football for Aston Villa U23s – in a 2–2 draw away at Burnley U23s in the Premier League 2. On 26 December 2020, Heaton returned to the first team squad for the first time since his injury, featuring as an unused substitute in a 3–0 home win over Crystal Palace.

On 28 May 2021, it was announced that Heaton would leave Aston Villa at the end of his contract.

=== Return to Manchester United ===
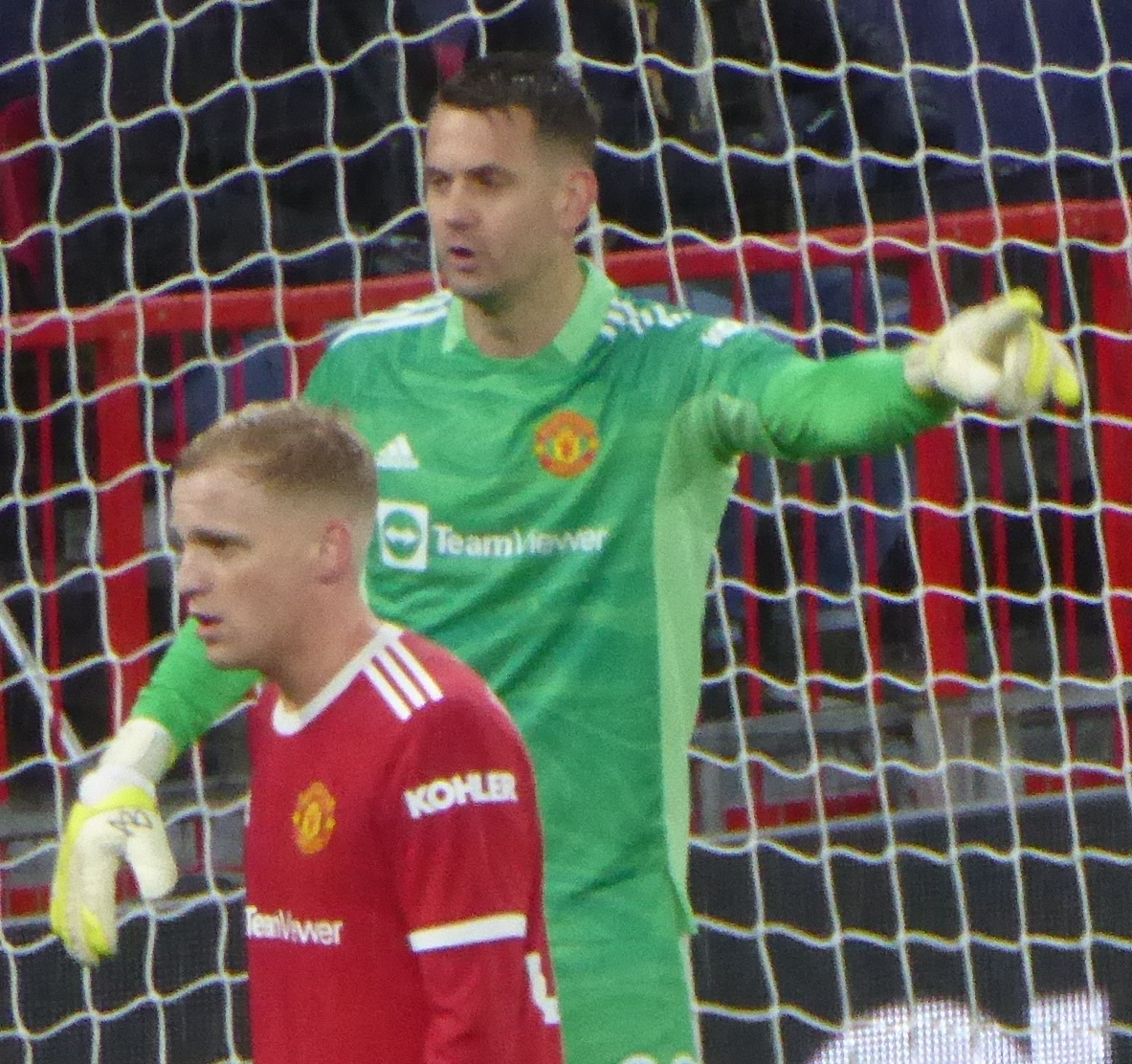
Heaton playing for Manchester United in 2021

Following his release by Aston Villa, Heaton agreed to return to Manchester United on 2 July 2021, 11 years after first leaving them. He signed a two-year contract with the option of an extra year. On 8 December 2021, Heaton made his first-team debut, replacing Dean Henderson in the 68th minute of the 2021–22 UEFA Champions League match against Young Boys.

On 10 January 2023, Heaton started his first match for United in the EFL Cup game against Charlton Athletic, keeping a clean sheet in a 3–0 victory to help United qualify for the semi-finals. On 1 February 2023, he started in the second leg of the semi-final against Nottingham Forest, keeping another clean sheet as his team won 2–0 on the night (5–0 on aggregate) to reach the final.

On 2 July 2024, he signed a one-year contract extension with the club. A year later, on 27 June, he signed a one-year extension until 2026. Despite making only three first-team appearances since returning to the club, he signed another one-year extension in June 2026, extending his contract until 2027.

== International career ==
Having played for England at various youth levels, Heaton was handed his England under-21 debut in March 2008 by manager Stuart Pearce when he replaced Joe Hart as a substitute during a match against Poland. However, he did not make the final squad for the 2009 UEFA European Under-21 Championship.

On 21 May 2015, Heaton was called up to the England senior team for the first time ahead of a friendly against the Republic of Ireland and a UEFA Euro 2016 qualifying match against Slovenia. Heaton continued to be included in Roy Hodgson's squads before finally making his debut as an 87th-minute substitute in place of Fraser Forster in England's Euro 2016 warm-up match against Australia, played at Sunderland's Stadium of Light. He was named in the squad for the UEFA Euro 2016 and wore the number 23.

On 16 May 2018, he was one of five players named on standby for the 23-man England squad for the 2018 FIFA World Cup. Heaton was also part of the squad which finished third at the 2019 UEFA Nations League Finals in Portugal.

On 10 June 2024, Heaton was called up by England to work as a training goalkeeper for UEFA Euro 2024.

== Career statistics ==
=== Club ===
As of match played 1 February 2023

Appearances and goals by club, season and competition
Club	Season	League			FA Cup		League Cup		Europe		Other		Total	
Club	Season	Division	Apps	Goals	Apps	Goals	Apps	Goals	Apps	Goals	Apps	Goals	Apps	Goals
Manchester United	2006–07	Premier League	0	0	0	0	0	0	0	0	—		0	0
Manchester United	2007–08	Premier League	0	0	0	0	0	0	0	0	0	0	0	0
Manchester United	Total		0	0	0	0	0	0	0	0	0	0	0	0
Swindon Town (loan)	2005–06	League One	14	0	2	0	1	0	—		2 (Note: Appearances in Football League Trophy)	0	19	0
Royal Antwerp (loan)	2005–06	Belgian Second Division	0	0	—		—		—		—		0	0
Cardiff City (loan)	2008–09	Championship	21	0	1	0	2	0	—		—		24	0
Queens Park Rangers (loan)	2009–10	Championship	0	0	—		2	0	—		—		2	0
Rochdale (loan)	2009–10	League Two	12	0	0	0	—		—		—		12	0
Wycombe Wanderers (loan)	2009–10	League One	16	0	—		—		—		—		16	0
Cardiff City	2010–11	Championship	27	0	1	0	2	0	—		0	0	30	0
Cardiff City	2011–12	Championship	2	0	1	0	7	0	—		0	0	10	0
Cardiff City	Total		29	0	2	0	9	0	—		0	0	40	0
Bristol City	2012–13	Championship	43	0	1	0	0	0	—		—		44	0
Burnley	2013–14	Championship	46	0	1	0	3	0	—		—		50	0
Burnley	2014–15	Premier League	38	0	2	0	0	0	—		—		40	0
Burnley	2015–16	Championship	46	0	2	0	0	0	—		—		48	0
Burnley	2016–17	Premier League	35	0	1	0	0	0	—		—		36	0
Burnley	2017–18	Premier League	4	0	0	0	0	0	—		—		4	0
Burnley	2018–19	Premier League	19	0	0	0	1	0	2 (Note: Appearances in UEFA Europa League)	0	—		22	0
Burnley	Total		188	0	6	0	4	0	2	0	—		200	0
Aston Villa	2019–20	Premier League	20	0	0	0	0	0	—		—		20	0
Aston Villa	2020–21	Premier League	0	0	0	0	0	0	—		—		0	0
Aston Villa	Total		20	0	0	0	0	0	—		—		20	0
Manchester United	2021–22	Premier League	0	0	0	0	0	0	1 (Note: Appearance in UEFA Champions League)	0	—		1	0
Manchester United	2022–23	Premier League	0	0	0	0	2	0	0	0	—		2	0
Manchester United	2023–24	Premier League	0	0	0	0	0	0	0	0	—		0	0
Manchester United	2024–25	Premier League	0	0	0	0	0	0	0	0	0	0	0	0
Manchester United	2025–26	Premier League	0	0	0	0	0	0	—		—		0	0
Manchester United	2026–27	Premier League	0	0	0	0	0	0	0	0	—		0	0
Manchester United	Total		0	0	0	0	2	0	1	0	0	0	3	0
Career total			343	0	12	0	20	0	3	0	2	0	380	0

=== International ===
Appearances and goals by national team and year
National team	Year	Apps	Goals
England	2016	2	0
England	2017	1	0
Total		3	0

== Honours ==
Cardiff City

- Football League Cup runner-up: 2011–12

Burnley

- Football League Championship: 2015–16

Manchester United

- EFL Cup: 2022–23
- FA Cup runner-up: 2022–23

England

- UEFA Nations League third place: 2018–19

Individual

- PFA Team of the Year: 2015–16 Championship
