= Tony Capaldi =

Former Northern Ireland international footballer

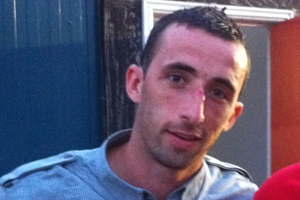
- Capaldi in 2013

Personal information
- Full name: Anthony Charles Capaldi
- Date of birth: 12 August 1981 (age 45)
- Place of birth: Porsgrunn, Norway
- Height: 6 ft 0 in (1.83 m)
- Positions: Left back; left winger

Youth career
- 1998–1999: Birmingham City

Senior career*
Years	Team	Apps	(Gls)
1999–2003	Birmingham City	0	(0)
2001–2002	→ Hereford United (loan)	12	(0)
2003–2007	Plymouth Argyle	141	(12)
2007–2010	Cardiff City	62	(0)
2009–2010	→ Leeds United (loan)	3	(0)
2010–2011	Morecambe	18	(0)
2011–2013	Oxford United	30	(0)
2013–2014	Tamworth	24	(0)
2014	Barwell	11	(0)
2014–2017	Rushall Olympic	5	(0)

International career
1999–2000	Northern Ireland U18	4	(1)
2001–2003	Northern Ireland U21	14	(0)
2004–2007	Northern Ireland	22	(0)
- * Club domestic league appearances and goals

Anthony Charles Capaldi (born 12 August 1981) is a former footballer who made nearly 250 appearances in the Football League and is a Northern Ireland former international.

Born in Porsgrunn, Norway, Capaldi won 22 caps for Northern Ireland at full international level, 21 of which were as a Plymouth Argyle player, a total that made him the club's most-capped international. He played in the Football League for Plymouth Argyle, Cardiff City, Leeds United, Morecambe and Oxford United. Capaldi can play in defence as a left back or as a left-sided midfielder.

== Club career ==
Capaldi began his career at Birmingham City, where he came through the youth ranks as a trainee. During his time at Birmingham he spent time on loan at Hereford United before signing for Plymouth Argyle near the end of the 2002–03 season without making a first-team appearance for Birmingham.

Capaldi sat out for much of the first part of the 2004–05 season after breaking a leg during a game, but in December 2004 he signed a two-year extension to his contract, to run until June 2007.

=== Cardiff City ===
Capaldi rejected a new contract with Plymouth and on 25 May 2007 he signed a three-year contract with Cardiff City, joining on a Bosman free transfer. He began the season as first-choice left back but after struggling to perform consistently found himself dropped from the side, being replaced by Chris Gunter. Following the sale of Gunter on 1 January, he returned to the first-team squad and began to settle more comfortably into the side, including playing in all six of the club's matches on their run to the 2008 FA Cup Final.

The start of the 2008–09 season saw Capaldi sidelined due to a knee problem. After sitting out the first fortnight of the season, he returned to first-team action on 26 August in a 2–1 League Cup victory over Milton Keynes Dons, only for him to suffer a recurrence of the problem. Capaldi spent over three months on the sidelines with the injury and, after being named on the bench for several games, made his return as a substitute for Chris Burke during a 0–0 draw with Arsenal in the fourth round of the FA Cup on 25 January. He featured in just five matches for the club throughout the season.

On 18 August 2009, Capaldi was sent off for a second bookable offence away to his old club Plymouth Argyle. Cardiff won the match 3–1 with Michael Chopra scoring a hat-trick. Capaldi returned to the side in a 3–2 loss to South Wales rivals Swansea City, playing on the left of midfield in place of the injured Peter Whittingham. However, due to a lack of appearances, Capaldi stated that he might need to look elsewhere for first-team football.

=== Loan to Leeds United ===
On 26 November 2009, Capaldi joined League One leaders Leeds United on loan until 4 January 2010, with a view to a permanent move, and was given permission to play for Leeds in the FA Cup. Having been recommended a move to Leeds by the club's assistant manager Glynn Snodin and Cardiff teammate Warren Feeney, he made his debut in a 1–1 draw with Kettering Town in the second round of the FA Cup, before making his league debut against Oldham Athletic. After playing against Huddersfield Town, Capaldi reiterated his desire to join Leeds permanently in January.

Capaldi was dropped for the replay against Kettering, being replaced by Aidy White, but White suffered an injury during the game and Capaldi came on to replace him. With White still out injured in the next game Capaldi came back into the starting line-up for a 0–0 draw with Brentford. However, with the return of Andy Hughes from injury, Capaldi was dropped from the squad for four consecutive games before being an unused substitute for the final game of his loan spell, a 1–0 win over Manchester United in the FA Cup.

=== Return to Cardiff City ===
Capaldi returned to Cardiff on 5 January 2010 after Leeds decided against extending his loan spell. He made nine appearances during the final five months of the season before being released at the end of the year.

=== Later years ===
Following his release, Capaldi spent time on trial with Plymouth Argyle, Crystal Palace and Heart of Midlothian before signing a short-term deal with Morecambe on 16 September 2010, reuniting him with former Northern Ireland manager Sammy McIlroy. Capaldi had a trial with Scottish Premier League club Aberdeen in early 2011 and featured in two friendly matches. In June 2011, Capaldi joined Oxford United and signed a two-year contract. Injury kept him out of the first-team squad for almost the whole 2011–12 season: he finally made his Oxford debut in a 3–0 defeat to Port Vale on the final day of the season. Capaldi was released by Oxford when his contract expired at the end of the 2012–13 season; he made 39 appearances for the club in league and cup competitions. He spent time on trial at Tamworth that summer and signed in August ahead of the club's new season in the Conference Premier.

== International career ==
Although born in Norway to a Scottish father and raised in Birmingham, Capaldi chose to represent Northern Ireland. He was eligible because his grandmother was born in Limavady. Capaldi has represented Northern Ireland 22 times at senior level, making his debut in March 2004 in a 1–0 victory over Estonia as well as playing in their famous 1–0 victory over England in September 2005. Capaldi broke Welshman Moses Russell's 78-year-old record for international appearances made by a Plymouth Argyle player when he was awarded his 21st cap in a friendly against Wales.

== Personal life ==
Capaldi was born in Porsgrunn, Norway, while his Scottish father, John Capaldi, was playing for the local team Pors Grenland. His father also played for Aston Villa and Motherwell and had a spell managing Bolehall Swifts.

== Honours ==
Plymouth Argyle

- Football League Second Division: 2003–04

Cardiff City

- FA Cup runner-up: 2007–08
