= Sokół Pniewy =

Polish association football club

- Full name: Klub Sportowy Sokół Pniewy
- Founded: 1945; 80 years ago
- Stadium: Municipal Stadium
- Capacity: 960
- Chairman: Bartosz Wachowiak
- 2024–25: V liga Greater Poland I, 13th of 16
- Website: https://sokolpniewy.futbolowo.pl

Klub Sportowy Sokół Pniewy is an association football club based in Pniewy, Poland. They withdrew their senior team from competition at the end of the 2024–25 season.

== History ==
Sokół Pniewy was founded in 1945.
