= 2010–11 Cardiff City F.C. season =

Welsh football club season

Cardiff City
2010–11 season
- Chairman: Datuk Chan Tien Ghee
- Manager: Dave Jones
- Stadium: Cardiff City Stadium
- Football League Championship: 4th
- FA Cup: Third round (eliminated by Stoke City)
- Football League Cup: Second round (eliminated by Peterborough United)
- Top goalscorer: League: Jay Bothroyd (18); All: Jay Bothroyd (20)
- Highest home attendance: 26,058 (vs. Queens Park Rangers, 23 April 2011)
- Lowest home attendance: 6,080 (vs. Burton Albion, 11 August 2010)
- Average home league attendance: 22,091
Home colours	Away colours	Third colours

The 2010–11 season was Cardiff City F.C.'s 84th in the Football League since joining in 1920. The season has been nicknamed "I'll be there", which is to promote the celebration of 100 years as a club under its current name. They will play their eighth consecutive year in the second tier of English football, the Football League Championship, after being beaten by Blackpool in the play-off final last season. Malaysian businessman Datuk Chan Tien Ghee became the successor of Peter Ridsdale as Cardiff City chairman. The £6m deal was confirmed on 27 May 2010.

== Season review ==
=== "I'll be there" ===
Cardiff City released a new initiative for the 2010–11 season, as their "I'll be there" campaign. The nickname comes from one of the earliest songs sung by City fans, since the early 1920s. Cardiff's new board has renamed the Level Four area of Cardiff City Stadium the "Centenary Suite". The season tickets and tickets will be printed with the popular white and yellow strips of the 70s.

=== Events ===
- 27 May 2010 – The £6 million deal for the club is agreed between the Malaysian businessman Datuk Chan Tien Ghee and Peter Ridsdale. Gethin Jenkins (CEO), Doug Lee (finance director) and non-executive directors, Paul Guy, U-Jiun Tan and Michael Isaac join Steve Borley and Alan Whiteley on the board whilst Alan Flitcroft and Keith Harris step down alongside Ridsdale.
- 10 June 2010 – Cardiff pay off £1.9m of debt to HM Revenue and Customs.
- 16 June 2010 – The winding-up petition placed against the club by HM Revenue & Customs is withdrawn.
- 29 June 2010 – Cardiff postpone their Malaysian pre-season tour until next season.
- 6 July 2010 – Cardiff are hit with a transfer embargo due to tax troubles, but chief executive Gethin Jenkins states that the club is confident it will paid off.
- 8 July 2010 – Cardiff pay off £1.3m of tax to HM Revenue & Customs, but the transfer embargo stays in place due to the club not submitting year-end accounts for May 2009.]
- 6 August 2010 – Cardiff confirm that their transfer embargo is lifted. They register their three summer signings with the Football League.
- 20 August 2010 – Dave Jones confirms that loan signing Craig Bellamy will be team captain and Mark Hudson will be club captain. Cardiff pay Motherwell half of their £175,000, which is owed to them for the transfer of Paul Quinn.
- 25 August 2010 – Cardiff complete the payment of £175,000 to Motherwell, for the transfer of Paul Quinn.
- 14 October 2010 – Jay Bothroyd is called up to England team to play France on 17 November. Bothroyd is the first Cardiff City player to be called up to the England team in their 111-year history.
- 16 March 2011 – Cardiff City are fined £5,000 for being unable to control their players against Reading on 1 February 2010 at the Cardiff City Stadium

=== Championship data ===
==== Standings ====
Pos	Team	Pld	W	D	L	GF	GA	GD	Pts	Promotion, qualification or relegation
2	Norwich City (P)	46	23	15	8	83	58	+25	84	Promotion to the Premier League
3	Swansea City (O, P)	46	24	8	14	69	42	+27	80	Qualification for Championship play-offs
4	Cardiff City	46	23	11	12	76	54	+22	80	Qualification for Championship play-offs
5	Reading	46	20	17	9	77	51	+26	77	Qualification for Championship play-offs
6	Nottingham Forest	46	20	15	11	69	50	+19	75	Qualification for Championship play-offs

Updated to match(es) played on 7 May 2011. Source: The Football League
Rules for classification: 1) points; 2) goal difference; 3) number of goals scored.
(O) Play-off winners; (P) Promoted

==== Results summary ====
Overall								Home						Away					
Pld	W	D	L	GF	GA	GD	Pts	W	D	L	GF	GA	GD	W	D	L	GF	GA	GD
46	23	11	12	76	54	+22	80	12	7	4	41	25	+16	11	4	8	35	29	+6

Last updated: 7 May 2011.

==== Result round by round ====
Round	1	2	3	4	5	6	7	8	9	10	11	12	13	14	15	16	17	18	19	20	21	22	23	24	25	26	27	28	29	30	31	32	33	34	35	36	37	38	39	40	41	42	43	44	45	46
Ground	H	A	H	A	H	A	A	H	H	A	H	A	A	H	H	A	A	H	A	H	A	H	A	A	H	A	H	H	A	H	H	A	H	A	H	A	H	A	H	A	A	H	H	A	H	A
Result	D	W	W	W	W	L	L	W	D	W	W	W	W	W	L	D	W	L	L	D	L	W	L	L	W	D	W	D	W	W	D	L	W	W	L	L	D	D	W	W	W	W	D	W	L	D
Position	12	7	2	2	2	2	3	2	2	2	2	2	2	1	2	2	1	2	2	2	2	2	2	5	2	3	2	5	3	2	2	4	3	3	3	4	4	4	3	3	2	2	3	3	3	4

Updated to match(es) played on 7 May 2011. Source: statto.com
A = Away; H = Home; W = Win; D = Draw; L = Loss

== Kits ==
Supplier: Puma
Sponsor(s): SBOBET

Home	Home Alternate	Away	Alternative	GK Home	GK Away

Last updated: 11 September 2012.

== Squad ==
No.	Name	Pos.	Nat.	Place of Birth	Age	Apps	Goals	Signed from	Date signed	Fee	Ends
Goalkeepers
1	David Marshall	GK	(Scotland)	Glasgow	26	62	0	Norwich City	12 May 2009	£500,000	2012
13	Jason Brown	GK	(Wales) (England)	Southwark	29	0	0	Blackburn Rovers	3 March 2011	Loan	2011
22	Tom Heaton	GK	(England)	Chester	25	54	0	Manchester United	16 June 2010	Free	2012
43	Stephen Bywater	GK	(England)	Manchester	30	10	0	Derby County	4 March 2011	Loan	2011
Defenders
2	Kevin McNaughton	RB	(Scotland)	Dundee	28	204	2	Aberdeen	26 May 2006	Free	2013
3	Lee Naylor	LB	(England)	Bloxwich	31	32	2	Celtic	19 August 2010	Free	2012
5	Mark Hudson	CB	(England)	Guildford	29	76	2	Charlton Athletic	2 July 2009	£1,075,000	2012
6	Gábor Gyepes	CB	(Hungary)	Budapest	30	72	3	Northampton Town	19 August 2008	£200,000	2013
12	Dekel Keinan	CB	(Israel)	Rosh HaNikra	26	20	2	Blackpool	21 January 2011	£300,000	2013
14	Paul Quinn	RB	(Scotland)	Wishaw	25	54	1	Motherwell	2 July 2009	£200,000	2012
21	Jlloyd Samuel	LB	(Trinidad and Tobago)	San Fernando	30	7	0	Bolton Wanderers	24 March 2011	Loan	2011
23	Darcy Blake	CB	(Wales)	New Tredegar	22	90	0	Academy	1 June 2005	Trainee	2013
26	Martin John	LB	(England)	London	22	1	0	Argentinos Juniors	11 August 2010	Free	2011
27	Adam Matthews	RB	(Wales)	Swansea	19	48	1	Academy	14 January 2009	Trainee	2011
Midfielders
4	Gavin Rae	CM	(Scotland)	Aberdeen	33	152	8	Rangers	7 October 2007	Free	2011
7	Peter Whittingham	LM/CM	(England)	Nuneaton	26	209	53	Aston Villa	11 January 2007	£350,000	2013
10	Stephen McPhail	CM	(Republic of Ireland) (England)	London	31	164	3	Barnsley	13 June 2006	Free	2013
11	Chris Burke	RW	(Scotland)	Glasgow	27	118	16	Rangers	9 January 2009	Free	2011
18	Solomon Taiwo	CM	(Nigeria)	Lagos	26	10	0	Dagenham & Redbridge	25 August 2009	£250,000	2012
19	Jason Koumas	AM	(Wales)	Wrexham	31	74	15	Wigan Athletic	4 August 2010	Loan	2011
20	Seyi Olofinjana	CM	(Nigeria)	Lagos	31	42	6	Hull City	10 August 2010	Loan	2011
28	Aaron Wildig	CM	(England)	Hereford	19	21	1	Academy	15 April 2009	Trainee	2012
Forwards
8	Michael Chopra	CF	(England)	Newcastle upon Tyne	27	161	63	Sunderland	1 July 2009	£3,000,000	2012
9	Jay Bothroyd	CF	(England)	London	29	133	45	Wolverhampton Wanderers	4 August 2008	£350,000	2011
16	Jon Parkin	CF	(England)	Barnsley	30	13	1	Preston North End	1 January 2011	£100,000	2013
25	Jay Emmanuel-Thomas	RW/CF	(England)	London	20	16	2	Arsenal	18 January 2011	Loan	2011
39	Craig Bellamy	LW/CF	(Wales)	Cardiff	31	36	11	Manchester City	17 August 2010	Loan	2011
49	Nathaniel Jarvis	CF	(Wales)	Cardiff	19	0	0	Academy	1 June 2010	Trainee	2011

- All appearances and goals are correct to 30 June 2011.

=== Statistics ===
As of 17 May 2011

No.	Pos	Nat	Player	Total		Championship		FA Cup		League Cup		Play-offs	
No.	Pos	Nat	Player	Apps	Goals	Apps	Goals	Apps	Goals	Apps	Goals	Apps	Goals
1	GK	(Scotland) SCO	David Marshall	12	0	11+0	0	1+0	0	0+0	0	0+0	0
2	DF	(Scotland) SCO	Kevin McNaughton	47	0	44+0	0	1+0	0	0+0	0	2+0	0
3	DF	(England) ENG	Lee Naylor	32	2	25+3	2	2+0	0	1+0	0	1+0	0
4	MF	(Scotland) SCO	Gavin Rae	10	1	2+5	1	2+0	0	1+0	0	0+0	0
5	DF	(England) ENG	Mark Hudson	43	0	39+1	0	2+0	0	1+0	0	0+0	0
6	DF	(Hungary) HUN	Gábor Gyepes	23	1	16+5	1	1+0	0	1+0	0	0+0	0
7	MF	(England) ENG	Peter Whittingham	50	11	45+0	11	1+0	0	2+0	0	2+0	0
8	FW	(England) ENG	Michael Chopra	39	11	26+8	9	1+1	1	1+0	1	1+1	0
9	FW	(England) ENG	Jay Bothroyd	41	20	37+0	18	0+0	0	2+0	2	2+0	0
10	MF	(Republic of Ireland) IRL	Stephen McPhail	31	0	23+5	0	2+0	0	0+1	0	0+0	0
11	MF	(Scotland) SCO	Chris Burke	50	5	31+13	5	2+0	0	2+0	0	2+0	0
12	DF	(Israel) ISR	Dekel Keinan	20	2	18+0	2	0+0	0	0+0	0	2+0	0
13	GK	(Wales) WAL	Jason Brown (on loan from Blackburn Rovers)	0	0	0+0	0	0+0	0	0+0	0	0+0	0
14	DF	(Scotland) SCO	Paul Quinn	27	1	22+1	1	1+0	0	2+0	0	1+0	0
15	DF	(England) ENG	Anthony Gerrard (on loan at Hull City)	2	0	0+0	0	0+0	0	2+0	0	0+0	0
16	FW	(England) ENG	Jon Parkin	13	1	2+9	1	1+0	0	0	0	0+1	0
18	MF	(Nigeria) NGR	Solomon Taiwo	0	0	0+0	0	0+0	0	0+0	0	0+0	0
19	MF	(Wales) WAL	Jason Koumas (on loan from Wigan Athletic)	27	2	5+18	2	0+0	0	1+1	0	0+2	0
20	MF	(Nigeria) NGR	Seyi Olofinjana (on loan from Hull City)	42	6	38+1	6	0+0	0	1+0	0	2+0	0
21	DF	(Trinidad and Tobago) TTO	Jlloyd Samuel (on loan from Bolton Wanderers)	7	0	6+0	0	0+0	0	0+0	0	1+0	0
22	GK	(England) ENG	Tom Heaton	30	0	27+0	0	1+0	0	2+0	0	0+0	0
23	DF	(Wales) WAL	Darcy Blake	30	0	13+13	0	1+1	0	0+0	0	2+0	0
25	FW	(England) ENG	Jay Emmanuel-Thomas (on loan from Arsenal)	16	2	7+7	2	0+0	0	0+0	0	2+0	0
26	DF	(England) ENG	Martin John	1	0	0+0	0	0+0	0	1+0	0	0+0	0
27	DF	(Wales) WAL	Adam Matthews	13	0	2+6	0	0+2	0	2+0	0	0+1	0
28	MF	(England) ENG	Aaron Wildig	4	0	0+2	0	0+1	0	0+1	0	0+0	0
29	MF	(Wales) WAL	Jonathan Meades	0	0	0+0	0	0+0	0	0+0	0	0+0	0
30	GK	(Canada) CAN	Jordan Santiago	0	0	0+0	0	0+0	0	0+0	0	0+0	0
39	FW	(Wales) WAL	Craig Bellamy (on loan from Manchester City)	36	11	34+1	11	0+0	0	0+0	0	1+0	0
43	GK	(England) ENG	Stephen Bywater (on loan from Derby County	10	0	8+0	0	0+0	0	0+0	0	2+0	0
49	FW	(Wales) WAL	Nathaniel Jarvis	0	0	0+0	0	0+0	0	0+0	0	0+0	0
Players played for Cardiff City this season but who have left the club:
~~21~~	MF	(England) ENG	Danny Drinkwater (on loan from Manchester United)	13	0	7+2	0	1+1	0	2+0	0	0+0	0
~~17~~	FW	(Republic of Ireland) IRL	Andy Keogh (on loan from Wolverhampton Wanderers)	18	2	11+5	2	2+0	0	0+0	0	0+0	0
~~24~~	MF	(Wales) WAL	Aaron Ramsey (on loan from Arsenal)	6	1	6+0	1	0+0	0	0+0	0	0+0	0
~~31~~	DF	(England) ENG	Chris Riggott	2	0	2+0	0	0+0	0	0+0	0	0+0	0

==== Captains ====
Number	Pos	Player	Starts (as captain)
39	FW	Craig Bellamy	35
5	CB	Mark Hudson	15
8	FW	Michael Chopra	1
2	RB	Kevin McNaughton	1

==== Goalscoring record ====
Rank	No.	Po.	Name	Championship	FA Cup	League Cup	Total
1	9	FW	Jay Bothroyd	18	0	2	20
2	39	FW	Craig Bellamy	11	0	0	11
2	8	FW	Michael Chopra	9	1	1	11
2	7	MF	Peter Whittingham	11	0	0	11
5	20	MF	Seyi Olofinjana	6	0	0	6
6	11	MF	Chris Burke	5	0	0	5
7	25	FW	Jay Emmanuel-Thomas	2	0	0	2
7	12	DF	Dekel Keinan	2	0	0	2
7	~~17~~	FW	Andy Keogh	2	0	0	2
7	19	MF	Jason Koumas	2	0	0	2
7	3	DF	Lee Naylor|	2	0	0	2
12	6	DF	Gábor Gyepes	1	0	0	1
12	16	FW	Jon Parkin	1	0	0	1
12	14	DF	Paul Quinn	1	0	0	1
12	4	MF	Gavin Rae	1	0	0	1
12	~~24~~	MF	Aaron Ramsey	1	0	0	1
Total				75	1	3	79

==== Disciplinary record ====
N	P	Name	Championship		FA Cup		League Cup		Play-offs		Total	
N	P	Name	Yellow card	Red card	Yellow card	Red card	Yellow card	Red card	Yellow card	Red card	Yellow card	Red card
9	FW	Jay Bothroyd	9	0	0	0	0	0	1	0	10	0
39	FW	Bellamy	9	0	0	0	0	0	0	0	9	0
23	MF	Blake	1	1	0	0	0	0	0	0	1	1
8	FW	Michael Chopra	5	0	0	0	0	0	0	0	5	0
12	DF	Keinan	4	0	0	0	0	0	1	0	5	0
6	DF	Gábor Gyepes	3	0	1	0	0	0	0	0	4	0
10	MF	Stephen McPhail	4	0	0	0	0	0	0	0	4	0
7	MF	Peter Whittingham	4	0	0	0	0	0	0	0	4	0
5	DF	Mark Hudson	3	0	0	0	0	0	0	0	3	0
2	DF	Kevin McNaughton	3	0	0	0	0	0	0	0	3	0
11	MF	Chris Burke	2	0	0	0	0	0	0	0	2	0
19	MF	Koumas	1	0	0	0	0	0	1	0	2	0
3	DF	Lee Naylor	2	0	0	0	0	0	0	0	2	0
14	DF	Quinn	2	0	0	0	0	0	0	0	2	0
21	DF	Samuel	2	0	0	0	0	0	0	0	2	0
22	GK	Heaton	1	0	0	0	0	0	0	0	1	0
27	DF	Matthews	1	0	0	0	0	0	0	0	1	0
~~17~~	FW	Keogh	1	0	0	0	0	0	0	0	1	0
20	MF	Olofinjana	1	0	0	0	0	0	0	0	1	0
16	FW	Parkin	1	0	0	0	0	0	0	0	1	0
Total			59	1	0	0	1	0	3	0	63	0

=== Suspensions ===
Player	Date Received	Matches Missed	Reason	Missed Opponents	Notes
Darcy Blake	2 October 2010	1	sent off against Barnsley	Bristol City (H)	
Jay Bothroyd	30 October 2010	1	Reached five yellow cards	Swansea City (H)	

=== Penalties ===
Date	Penalty Taker	Scored	Opponent	Competition
25 September	(England) Peter Whittingham	No	Millwall	Championship
2 October	(England) Peter Whittingham	No	Barnsley	Championship
19 October	(England) Peter Whittingham	Yes	Coventry City	Championship
30 October	(England) Peter Whittingham	Yes	Norwich City	Championship
25 February	(England) Peter Whittingham	Yes	Nottingham Forest	Championship
2 April	(England) Jay Bothroyd	Yes	Derby County	Championship

=== International Call-ups ===
No.	P	Name	Country	Level	Caps	Goals	Notes	Source
1	GK	Marhsall	Scotland	Senior	0	0		
2	RB	McNaughton	Scotland	Senior	0	0		
6	CB	Gyepes	Hungary	Senior	0	0		
9	ST	Bothroyd	England	Senior	1	0	First Cardiff City player to represent England	BBC Sport
11	RW	Burke	Scotland	Senior	0	0		
12	CB	Keinan	Israel	Senior	3	0		Fox Sports
23	RB	Blake	Wales	Senior	2	0		Daily Telegraph
27	RB	Matthews	Wales	under-21	3	0		
27	RB	Matthews	Wales	Senior	2	0		
29	CM	Meades	Wales	under-21	0	0		
39	FW	Bellamy	Wales	Senior	4	1		Soccerbase

* This includes all caps up until 1 July 2011.

== Transfers ==
=== Ins ===
No.	Pos.	Nat.	Name	Age	EU	Moving from	Type	Transfer window	Ends	Transfer fee	Source
30	GK	(Canada)	Jordan Santiago	19		Youth system	Promoted	Summer	2010	N/A	Wales Online
22	GK	(England)	Tom Heaton	24	EU	Manchester United (England)	Free Transfer	Summer	2012	Free	BBC Sport
29	MF	(Wales)	Jonathan Meades	18	EU	Youth system	Promoted	Summer	2012	N/A	Wales Online
26	DF	(England)	Martin John	22	EU	Argentinos Juniors (Argentina)	Free Transfer	Summer	2011	Free	
3	DF	(England)	Lee Naylor	30	EU	Celtic (Scotland)	Free Transfer	Summer	2012	Free	BBC Sport
31	DF	(England)	Chris Riggott	30	EU	Middlesbrough (England)	Free Transfer	Summer	2012	Free	BBC Sport
16	FW	(England)	Jon Parkin	29	EU	Preston North End (England)	Transfer	Winter	2013	£100,000	BBC Sport
12	DF	(Israel)	Dekel Keinan	26	EU	Blackpool (England)	Transfer	Winter	2013	£300,000^{1}	Cardiff City

- Total spending: ▼ ~ £0,400,000

Notes
^{1}Officially undisclosed but reported to be around £300,000.

=== Loans in ===
No.	Pos.	Name	Country	Age	Loan club	Started	Ended	Start source	End source
21	MF	Daniel Drinkwater	(England)	20	Manchester United	8 Jul	25 Jan	BBC Sport	BBC Sport
19	MF	Jason Koumas	(Wales)	31	Wigan Athletic	7 Aug	30 Jun	BBC Sport	
20	MF	Seyi Olofinjana	(Nigeria)	31	Hull City	10 Aug	30 Jun	BBC Sport	
39	FW	Craig Bellamy	(Wales)	31	Manchester City	17 Aug	30 Jun	The Guardian	
17	FW	Andy Keogh	(Republic of Ireland)	24	Wolverhampton Wanderers	25 Aug	31 Jan	Cardiff City	Cardiff City
25	FW	Jay Emmanuel-Thomas	(England)	20	Arsenal	18 Jan	30 Jun	BBC Sport	
24	MF	Aaron Ramsey	(Wales)	20	Arsenal	21 Jan	26 Feb	BBC Sport	BBC Sport
13	GK	Jason Brown	(Wales) (England)	29	Blackburn Rovers	3 Mar	30 Jun	BBC Sport	
43	GK	Stephen Bywater	(England)	30	Derby County	4 Mar	30 Jun	Cardiff City	
21	DF	Jlloyd Samuel	(Trinidad and Tobago)	30	Bolton Wanderers	24 Mar	30 Jun	BBC Sport	

Sources: For loan start source see "Start source". For loan end source see "End source".
EU = if holds or not a European Union passport; Country: when 2 flags, 1st flag = country that plays for internationally, 2nd flag = country of birth; No. = number on jersey; P = Position (for position name, pause mouse pointer on abbreviation); Name = Name on jersey (for more extensive name, pause mouse pointer on name); In/Out = In: The player came in on loan, Out: The player went out on loan; Loan club = the club that the player moved on loan to or the club that the player came from on loan; Started = the date when the player's loan started; Ended = the date when the player's loan ended.

=== Out ===
No.	Pos.	Name	Country	Age	Type	Moving to	Transfer window	Transfer fee	Apps	Goals	Source
3	DF	Tony Capaldi	(Northern Ireland) (Norway)	28	Contract Ended	Morecambe (England)	Summer	Free	72	0	BBC Sport
20	GK	Peter Enckelman	(Finland)	33	Contract Ended	St Johnstone (Scotland)	Summer	Free	42	0	BBC Sport
26	FW	Warren Feeney	(Republic of Ireland)	29	Contract Ended	Oldham Athletic (England)	Summer	Free	15	0	BBC Sport
16	MF	Joe Ledley	(Wales)	23	Contract Ended	Celtic (Scotland)	Summer	Free	256	30	BBC Sport
29	FW	Josh Magennis	(Northern Ireland)	19	Contract Ended	Aberdeen (Scotland)	Summer	Free	10	1	BBC Sport
32	DF	Aaron Morris	(Wales)	20	Contract Ended	Aldershot Town (England)	Summer	Free	4	0	BBC Sport
—	DF	Darren Dennehy	(Republic of Ireland)	21	Contract Ended	Barnet (England)	Summer	Free	0	0	
3	DF	Mark Kennedy	(Republic of Ireland)	34	Transfer	Ipswich Town (England)	Summer	£75,000	76	0	South Wales Echo
44	FW	Ross McCormack	(Scotland)	24	Transfer	Leeds United (England)	Summer	£400,000^{1}	88	30	Cardiff City
24	DF	Miguel Comminges	(Guadeloupe)	27	Transfer	Southend United (England)	Winter	Free	35	0	BBC Sport
31	DF	Chris Riggott	(England)	30	Contract Terminated	Free agent	Winter	Free	2	0	BBC Sport

EU = if holds or not a European Union passport; Country: when 2 flags, 1st flag = country that plays for internationally, 2nd flag = country of birth; N = number on jersey; P = Position (for position name, pause mouse pointer on abbreviation); Name = Name on jersey (for more extensive name, pause mouse pointer on name); Age = age on the day of the signing; Moving from = only indicate the club the player was playing before start playing for this club in this season, for the type of the moving see Status column; Moving to = only indicates the club the player is going to play next, for the type of the moving see Status column; Ends = when the player's current contract ends; n/a = Not applicable.

notes: ^{1}Although officially undisclosed, it was reported by Vital Football that the fee was £400,000.

- Total income: ▲ ~ £475,000

=== Loans out ===
No.	Pos.	Name	Country	Age	Loan club	Started	Ended	Start source	End source
29	MF	Jonathan Meades	(Wales)	18	Moss	18 Aug	11 Dec	Moss FK	South Wales Echo's YouTube page
15	DF	Anthony Gerrard	(England)	25	Hull City	30 Aug	10 May		Cardiff City Mad
26	DF	Martin John	(England)	22	Newport County	9 Sep	10 Dec		
49	FW	Nathaniel Jarvis	(Wales)	19	Southend United	24 Sep	25 Oct	BBC Sport	BBC Sport
18	MF	Solomon Taiwo	(Nigeria)	26	Dagenham & Redbridge	29 Oct	30 Jun		
24	DF	Miguel Comminges	(Guadeloupe)	28	Carlisle United	24 Nov	30 Dec	BBC Sport	Carlisle United
28	MF	Aaron Wildig	(England)	19	Hamilton Academical	25 Jan	30 Jun	BBC Sport	

Sources: For loan start source see "Start source". For loan end source see "End source".
EU = if holds or not a European Union passport; Country: when 2 flags, 1st flag = country that plays for internationally, 2nd flag = country of birth; No. = number on jersey; P = Position (for position name, pause mouse pointer on abbreviation); Name = Name on jersey (for more extensive name, pause mouse pointer on name); In/Out = In: The player came in on loan, Out: The player went out on loan; Loan club = the club that the player moved on loan to or the club that the player came from on loan; Started = the date when the player's loan started; Ended = the date when the player's loan ended.

=== Contracts ===
No.	Pos.	Nat.	Name	Age	Status	Contract length	Expiry date	Source
3	DF	(Republic of Ireland)	Mark Kennedy	34	Signed	1 year	June 2011	South Wales Echo
2	DF	(Scotland)	Kevin McNaughton	28	Signed	3 year	May 2013	BBC Sport
23	DF	(Wales)	Darcy Blake	21	Signed	2 year	May 2013	BBC Sport
7	MF	(England)	Peter Whittingham	26	Signed	2 year	May 2013	BBC Sport
10	MF	(Republic of Ireland) (England)	Stephen McPhail	30	Signed	2 year	May 2013	BBC Sport

== Fixtures and results ==
Win Draw Loss Upcoming fixture

=== Preseason ===
8 July 2010 Friendly	Bath City	0–2	Cardiff City	Bath
19:45 BST			4' Bothroyd; 47' Burke	Stadium: Twerton Park; Attendance: 780

17 July 2010 Friendly	Portimonense	3–0	Cardiff City	Algarve
	Candeias 5'; Moita 30'; Anderson 80'	(report)		Stadium: Estádio Municipal de Portimão; Attendance: 1914

19 July 2010 Friendly	Farense	1–1	Cardiff City	Algarve
				Stadium: Estádio Municipal de Portimão; Attendance: 945

24 July 2010 Friendly	Notts County	2–1	Cardiff City	Nottingham
15:00 BST	Hughes 28', 43'	(report)	60' McCormack	Stadium: Meadow Lane; Attendance: 2,490

31 July 2010 Friendly	Cardiff City	0–1	Deportivo La Coruña	Cardiff
15:00 BST			83' Dioni	Stadium: Cardiff City Stadium; Attendance: 10,208

=== Football League Championship ===
8 August 2010 1	Cardiff City	1–1	Sheffield United	Cardiff
12:35 BST	Bothroyd (yellow card) 37'; Rae (substituted off) McCormack (substituted on) 54'; Bothroyd 62'	(report)	24' Evans; (red card) 35' Lowton; (yellow card) 37' Evans; (substituted off) 68' Britton (substituted on) Kozluk; (substituted off) 68' Evans (substituted on) Bogdanovic; (yellow card) 78' Ward; (substituted off) 87' Ward (substituted on) Yeates	Stadium: Cardiff City Stadium; Attendance: 20,573; Referee: Peter Walton

14 August 2010 2	Derby County	1–2	Cardiff City	Derbyshire
15:00 BST	Cywka 25'; Barker (yellow card) 54'; Savage (yellow card) 58'; Savage (substituted off) Doyle (substituted on) 70'; Commons (substituted off) Pringle (substituted on) 76'	(report)	15' Chopra; (substituted off) 45+6'McNaughton (substituted on) Matthews; (yellow card) 49' Matthews; 78' Burke; (substituted off) 83' Chopra (substituted on) McCormack	Stadium: Pride Park Stadium; Attendance: 25,103; Referee: Nigel Miller

21 August 2010 3	Cardiff City	4–0	Doncaster Rovers	Cardiff
15:00 BST	McNaughton (substituted off) Naylor (substituted on) 18'; Chopra (substituted off) Burke (substituted on) 32'; Bothroyd 36', 62'; Burke 68'; Bellamy (yellow card) 82'; Bellamy 84'; Bellamy (substituted off) Koumas (substituted on) 87'	(report)	(substituted off) 60' Shiels (substituted on) Mason; (substituted off) 80' Gillett (substituted on) Brooker; (substituted off) 80' Friend (substituted on) Dumbuya; (yellow card) 83' Lockwood	Stadium: Cardiff City Stadium; Attendance: 24,027; Referee: Neil Swarbrick

28 August 2010 4	Portsmouth	0–2	Cardiff City	Portsmouth
15:00 BST	Mokoena (yellow card) 59'; Hughes (substituted off) Çiftçi (substituted on) 67'; Brown (substituted off) Pack (substituted on) 83'; Utaka (substituted off) Ritchie (substituted on) 87'	(report)	(substituted off) 28' Blake (substituted on) Matthews; Mullins 37' (o.g.); Bothroyd 49'; (substituted off) 79' Bellamy (substituted on) Keogh; (substituted off) 90+1' Bothroyd (substituted on) Koumas	Stadium: Fratton Park; Attendance: 15,866; Referee: Andy Penn

11 September 2010 5	Cardiff City	2–0	Hull City	Cardiff
15:00 BST	Olofinjana 20'; Olofinjana (substituted off) Rae (substituted on) 57'; Koumas (substituted off) Wildig (substituted on) 76'; Rae 81'	(report)	(substituted off) 46' Kilbane (substituted on) Cairney; (substituted off) 61' Fagan (substituted on) Simpson; (substituted off) 61' Barmby (substituted on) Cullen	Stadium: Cardiff City Stadium; Attendance: 24,083; Referee: Oliver Langford

14 September 2010 6	Leicester City	2–1	Cardiff City	Leicester
19:45 BST	King 51', 68'; King (substituted off) Abe (substituted on) 81'; Waghorn (substituted off) Gallagher (substituted on) 85'	(report)	26' Naylor; (substituted off) 60' Koumas (substituted on) Wildig; (substituted off) 69' McPhail (substituted on) Blake; (yellow card) 90+5' Blake	Stadium: Walkers Stadium; Attendance: 20,510; Referee: Karl Evans

18 September 2010 7	Ipswich Town	2–0	Cardiff City	Ipswich
15:00 BST	Wickham (yellow card) 40'; Townsend (substituted off) Peters (substituted on) 53'; Matthews 62' (o.g.); Scotland 74'; Scotland (substituted off) Healy (substituted on) 77'; Wickham (substituted off) Priskin (substituted on) 83'	(report)	(yellow card) 36' McPhail; (substituted off) 46' McPhail (substituted on) Rae; (substituted off) 46' McNaughton (substituted on) Matthews; (substituted off) 77' Bothroyd (substituted on) Koumas	Stadium: Portman Road; Attendance: 22,599; Referee: Fred Graham

25 September 2010 8	Cardiff City	2–1	Millwall	Cardiff
12:00 BST	Bothroyd 24'McPhail (substituted off) Koumas (substituted on) 64'; Blake (substituted off) Rae (substituted on) 81'; Keogh 89'; Keogh (yellow card) 89'	(report)	10'Barron; (red card) 40' Trotter; (substituted off) 69' Lisbie (substituted on) Schofield; (yellow card) 89' Morison; (yellow card) 90+3' Dunne	Stadium: Cardiff City Stadium; Attendance: 23,010; Referee: Lee Mason

28 September 2010 9	Cardiff City	0–0	Crystal Palace	Cardiff
19:45 BST	Burke (yellow card) 47'; Bothroyd (yellow card) 59'; Naylor (substituted off) Quinn (substituted on) 79'	(report)	(substituted off) 17' Davis (substituted on) Bennett; (substituted off) 19' Danns (substituted on) Dorman; (yellow card) 87' Marrow; (substituted off) 89' Djilali (substituted on) Cadogan	Stadium: Cardiff City Stadium; Attendance: 22,007; Referee: Steve Tanner

2 October 2010 10	Barnsley	1–2	Cardiff City	Barnsley
15:00 BST	Hammill (yellow card) 45+2'; Wood (substituted off) Gray (substituted on) 58'; Shackell 63'; Arismendi (yellow card) 84'; Arismendi (substituted off) Butterfield (substituted on) 90'	(report)	42' Bellamy; (yellow card) 48' Olofinjan; 67'Olofinjana; (yellow card) 76' Blake; (yellow card) (red card) 82' Blake; (yellow card) 89' Burke; (yellow card) 90+5' Bothroyd	Stadium: Oakwell; Attendance: 11,211; Referee: Trevor Kettle

16 October 2010 11	Cardiff City	3–2	Bristol City	Cardiff
12:00 BST	Bothroyd 12' (yellow card) 84'; Whittingham 46', 78'; McNaughton (yellow card) 61'; McPhail (substituted off) Koumas (substituted on) 73'; Chopra (yellow card) 81'; Burke (substituted off) Keogh (substituted on) 90'	(report)	6' Caulker; 8' Stead; (substituted off) 69' Adomah (substituted on) Sproule; (substituted off) 89' Skuse (substituted on) Pitman; (substituted off) 89' Haynes (substituted on) Clarkson	Stadium: Cardiff City Stadium; Attendance: 22,444; Referee: Jon Moss

19 October 2010 12	Coventry City	1–2	Cardiff City	Coventry
19:45 BST	McSheffrey 44'; Turner (yellow card) 4'; Clingan (yellow card) 60'; Jutkiewicz (substituted off) King (substituted on) 70'	(report)	5' (pen.) Whittingham; (substituted off) 71' Chopra (substituted on) Koumas; (substituted off) 82' Bellamy (substituted on) Keogh; 87' Bothroyd	Stadium: Ricoh Arena; Attendance: 14,604; Referee: James Linington

25 October 2010 13	Leeds United	0–4	Cardiff City	Leeds
19:45 BST	McCartney (yellow card) 62'; Somma (substituted off) Núñez (substituted on) 54'; Johnson (substituted off) Gradel (substituted on) 63'; Faye (substituted off) Clayton (substituted on) 81'	(report)	22' Bothroyd; 51' Chopra; 56' Bothroyd; 60' Naylor; (substituted off) 73' Chopra (substituted on) Keogh	Stadium: Elland Road; Attendance: 20,747; Referee: Michael Oliver

30 October 2010 14	Cardiff City	3–1	Norwich City	Cardiff
15:00 BST	Bothroyd 9'; Chopra 12'; Whittingham 37' (pen.); Bothroyd (yellow card) 63'; Bellamy (substituted off) Koumas (substituted on) 71'; Chopra (substituted off) McPhail (substituted on) 78'	(report)	(yellow card) 32' S Smith; 34' Hoolahan; (yellow card) 57' Barnett; (substituted off) 62' Jackson (substituted on) Martin; (substituted off) 62' Lappin (substituted on) McNamee; (yellow card) 67' Crofts; (substituted off) 81' Hoolahan (substituted on) Johnson; (yellow card) 90+2' Holt	Stadium: Cardiff City Stadium; Attendance: 24,634; Referee: Graham Scott

7 November 2010 15	Cardiff City	0–1	Swansea City	Cardiff
13:10 GMT	Bellamy (yellow card) 32'; Keogh (substituted off) Burke (substituted on) 58'; Gyepes (yellow card) 69'; McNaughton (substituted off) Blake (substituted on) 72'; Drinkwater (substituted off) Koumas (substituted on) 82'; Chopra (yellow card) 85'	(report)	(yellow card) 47' Àngel Rangel; 75' Emnes; (substituted off) 81' Emnes (substituted on) Dobbie; (substituted off) 81' Andrea Orlandi (substituted on) Àgustien; (yellow card) 85' Àllen; (substituted off) 90+2' Dyer (substituted on) Taylor	Stadium: Cardiff City Stadium; Attendance: 26,049; Referee: Mike Jones

10 November 2010 16	Reading	1–1	Cardiff City	Reading
20:00 GMT	Hunt 5'; Khizanishvili (yellow card) 48'; Church (substituted off) Tabb (substituted on) 69'; Hunt (substituted off) Robson-Kanu (substituted on) 74'	report	(substituted off) 58' McPhail (substituted on) Koumas; 77' Bothroyd; (substituted off) 84' Chopra (substituted on) Drinkwater	Stadium: Madejski Stadium; Attendance: 17,960; Referee: Andy D'Urso

13 November 2010 17	Scunthorpe United	2–4	Cardiff City	Scunthorpe
15:00 GMT	McDonald 45'; Woolford (substituted off) Dagnall (substituted on) 72'; N'Guessan 73'; Sears (substituted off) Grant (substituted on) 82'; Jones (substituted off) McNulty (substituted on) 89'	report	2' Bothroyd; 9' Chopra; (substituted off) 13' Burke (substituted on) Koumas; 34' Bothroyd; (yellow card) 45+1' McNaughton; (substituted off) 60' Blake (substituted on) Gyepes; (substituted off) 60' Naylor (substituted on) Matthews; 79' Olofinjana	Stadium: Glanford Park; Attendance: 5,333; Referee: Eddie Ilderton

20 November 2010 18	Cardiff City	0–2	Nottingham Forest	Cardiff
15:00 GMT	Chopra (substituted off) Drinkwater (substituted on) 48'; Blake (substituted off) Matthes (substituted on) 81'	report	23' McGugan; (yellow card) 65' Luke Chambers; (substituted off) 70' Earnshaw (substituted on) Blackstock; (yellow card) 71' McCleary; 84' Blackstock; (substituted off) 85' McCleary (substituted on) Lynch; (substituted off) 89' Blackstock (substituted on) Rodney	Stadium: Cardiff City Stadium; Attendance: 23,526; Referee: Colin Webster

27 November 2010 19	Queens Park Rangers	2–1	Cardiff City	London
15:00 GMT	Gorkšs 18'; Taarabt 68'; Hill (yellow card) 81'; Taarabt (substituted off) Clarke (substituted on) 87'; Clarke (yellow card) 89'; Mackie (substituted off) Agyemang (substituted on) 90'; Smith (substituted off) Hall (substituted on) 90+1'	report	13' Bellamy; (substituted off) 57' Drinkwater (substituted on) Koumas; (yellow card) 58' Koumas; (yellow card) 62' Whittingham; (substituted off) 80' Burke (substituted on) Chopra; (yellow card) 85' Bellamy	Stadium: Loftus Road; Attendance: 17,316; Referee: Kevin Friend

4 December 2010 20	Cardiff City	1–1	Preston North End	Cardiff
15:00 GMT	Bothroyd (substituted off) Keogh (substituted on) 8'; Blake (substituted off) Gyepes (substituted on) 26'; Hudson (yellow card) 38'; Naylor (yellow card) 45+1'; McPhail (substituted off) Chopra (substituted on) 57'; Chopra (yellow card) 76'; Keogh 90+4'	report	26' Tonge; (yellow card) 67' Hume; (substituted off) 87' Hume (substituted on) Davidson; (yellow card) 88' Tonge; (substituted off) 90+3' Parking (substituted on) Parry	Stadium: Cardiff City Stadium; Attendance: 21,151; Referee: Darren Deadman

11 December 2010 21	Middlesbrough	1–0	Cardiff City	Middlesbrough
15:00 GMT	Arca 40' (pen.); Arca (yellow card) 68'; Bennett (yellow card) 82'; Bailey (yellow card) 90'	report	(yellow card) 39' Gyepes; (substituted off) 51' Drinkwater (substituted on) Chopra; (yellow card) 81' Chopra	Stadium: Riverside Stadium; Attendance: 14,250; Referee: Anthony Bates

26 December 2010 22	Cardiff City	2–0	Coventry City	Cardiff
15:00 GMT	Olofinjana 21'; Bellamy (yellow card) 60'; Riggott (substituted off) Gyepes (substituted on) 68'; Bellamy 83'	report	(yellow card) 35' Doyle; (substituted off) 59' Clarke (substituted on) Platt; (substituted off) 59' McSheffery (substituted on) Eastwood; (yellow card) 84' Keogh	Stadium: Cardiff City Stadium; Attendance: 24,595; Referee: Graham Salisbury

28 December 2010 23	Watford	4–1	Cardiff City	Watford
15:00 GMT	Graham 24'; Taylor (yellow card) 35'; Sordell 57'; Eustace 64'; Graham 84' (pen.); Graham (substituted off) Massey (substituted on) 90+2'; Buckley (substituted off) Jenkins (substituted on) 90+2'; Mutch (substituted off) Walker (substituted on) 90+2'		16' Whittingham; (yellow card) 31' Naylor; (substituted off) 35' Naylor (substituted on) Matthews; (substituted off) 73' Burke (substituted on) Rae; (substituted off) 76' McPhail (substituted on) Koumas	Stadium: Vicarage Road; Attendance: 14,560; Referee: Mark Haywood

1 January 2011 24	Bristol City	3–0	Cardiff City	Bristol
15:00 GMT	Pitman 3'; Johnson (yellow card) 9'; Johnson 39'; Skuse (substituted off) Ribeiro (substituted on) 52'; Campbell-Ryce 55'; Campbell-Ryce (yellow card) 56'; Cissé (yellow card) 59'; Adomah (yellow card) 60'; Adomah (substituted off) Sproule (substituted on) 77'; Stead (substituted off) Clarkson (substituted on) 88'	report	(substituted off) 16' Riggott (substituted on) Blake; (substituted off) 49' Whittingham (substituted on) Burke; (substituted off) 67' Keogh (substituted on) Koumas; (yellow card) 71' Chopra	Stadium: Ashton Gate; Attendance: 15,683; Referee: Stuart Attwell

4 January 2011 25	Cardiff City	2–1	Leeds United	Cardiff
19:45 GMT	Bellamy 11'; Quinn (substituted off) Blake (substituted on) 74'; Burke (substituted off) McPhail (substituted on) 78'; Chopra 79'	report	(yellow card) 48' O'Brien; (yellow card) 55' Connolly; (substituted off) 57' McCormack (substituted on) Watt; (substituted off) 57' Gradel (substituted on) Sam; 59' Snodgrass; (substituted off) 63' Sam (substituted on) Becchio	Stadium: Cardiff City Stadium; Attendance: 25,010; Referee: Andy D'Urso

15 January 2011 26	Norwich City	1–1	Cardiff City	Norwich
15:00 GMT	C Martin (yellow card) 67'; Lansbury (substituted off) Wilbraham (substituted on) 72'; Crofts (substituted off) Smith (substituted on) 78'; C Martin (substituted off) Lappin (substituted on) 83'; R Martin 90'	report	7' Parkin; (yellow card) 68' McPhail; (substituted off) 74' McPhail (substituted on) Burke; (yellow card) 80' Bellamy; (yellow card) 82' Parkin	Stadium: Carrow Road; Attendance: 25,270; Referee: Keith Stroud

22 January 2011 27	Cardiff City	4–2	Watford	Cardiff
15:00 GMT	Bellamy 14'; Chopra 17'; Bothroyd 32'; Naylor (substituted off) Gyepes (substituted off) 40'; Bothroyd (substituted off) Burke (substituted on) 61'; Whittingham (substituted off) Rae (substituted on) 74'; Gyepes 83'	report	33' Buckley; 48' sordell (substituted off) 55' Bennett (substituted on) Hodson; (substituted off) 65' Townsend (substituted on) Whichelow	Stadium: Cardiff City Stadium; Attendance: 23,702; Referee: Steve Tanner

1 February 2011 28	Cardiff City	2–2	Reading	Cardiff
19:45 GMT	Olofinjana (substituted off) Chopra (substituted on) 46'; Bothroyd 48'; Hudson (yellow card) 64'; Emmanuel-Thomas (substituted off) Burke (yellow card) 76'; Bothroyd (substituted off) Parkin (substituted on) 85'; Bellamy 90+7'	report	(substituted off) 18' Long (substituted on) Hunt; 21' Leigertwood; (substituted off) 71' Church (substituted on) Manset; (yellow card) 86' Hunt; 90+2' Manset; (yellow card) 90+5' Mills; (yellow card) 90+6' McAnuff	Stadium: Cardiff City Stadium; Attendance: 21,405; Referee: Gavin Ward

6 February 2011 29	Swansea City	0–1	Cardiff City	Swansea
13:15 GMT	Gower (yellow card) 58'; Gower (substituted off) Allen (substituted on) 58'; Moore (substituted off) Beattie (substituted on) 66'; Tate (yellow card) 72'; Britton (substituted off) Dobbie (substituted on) 88'	Report	(yellow card) 44' Bothroyd; (substituted off) 46' McNaughton (substituted on) Blake; (substituted off) 67' Whittingham (substituted on) Burke; (substituted off) 75' Chopra (substituted on) Emmanuel-Thomas; (yellow card) 77' Keinan; 85' Bellamy	Stadium: Liberty Stadium; Attendance: 18,280; Referee: Mark Halsey

12 February 2011 30	Cardiff City	1–0	Scunthorpe United	Cardiff
15:00 GMT	Emmanuel-Thomas (substituted off) Burke (substituted on) 59'; Chopra (substituted off) Koumas (substituted on) 67'; Bellamy (substituted off) Parkin (substituted on) 79'; Olofinjana 85'	report	(substituted off) 71' Duffy (substituted on) Collins; (yellow card) 82' Garner; (substituted off) 82' Garner (substituted on) Ibrahim; (substituted off) 87' J Wright (substituted on) Grant	Stadium: Cardiff City Stadium; Attendance: 21,604; Referee: Phil Crossley

15 February 2011 31	Cardiff City	1–1	Burnley	Cardiff
19:45 GMT	McNaughton (yellow card) 21'; Chopra 45+1'; Chopra (substituted off) Bellamy (substituted on) 67'; Quinn (substituted off) Blake (substituted on) 67'; Burke (substituted off) Koumas (substituted on) 78'	report	(yellow card) 29' Marney; (substituted off) 67' Iwelumo (substituted on) Austin; (yellow card) 72' Fox; (substituted off) 74' Rodriquez (substituted on) Thompson; 84' Thompson; (substituted off) 90' Marney (substituted on) Alexander	Stadium: Cardiff City Stadium; Attendance: 21,307; Referee: Roger East

19 February 2011 32	Nottingham Forest	2–1	Cardiff City	Nottingham
15:00 GMT	Morgan 32'; Earnshaw 67'; Tudgay (substituted off) McGoldrick (substituted on) 71'; Earnshaw (substituted off) Tyson (substituted on) 81'; Anderson (substituted off) Adebola (substituted on) 89'	report	(substituted off) 56' Burke (substituted on) McPhail; (substituted off) 56' Parkin (substituted on) Emmanuel-Thomas; (yellow card) 57' Keinan; (yellow card) 61' Hudson; 64' (pen.) Whittingham; (yellow card) 75' Bothroyd	Stadium: City Ground; Attendance: 26,019; Referee: Jon Moss

21 February 2011 33	Cardiff City	2–0	Leicester City	Cardiff
19:45 GMT	Chopra 21'; Ramsey 52'; Chopra (substituted off) McPhail (substituted on) 53'; Olofinjana (substituted off) Parkin (substituted on) 77'; Whittingham (yellow card) 90+1'	report	(substituted off) 55' Gallagher (substituted on) Waghorn; (substituted off) 55' Wellens (substituted on) Abe; (substituted off) 67' Dyer (substituted on) Vassell	Stadium: Cardiff City Stadium; Attendance: 22,410; Referee: Danny McDermid

26 February 2011 34	Hull City	0–2	Cardiff City	Kingston upon Hull
15:00 GMT	Gerrard (substituted off) Hobbs (substituted on) 46'; McLean (substituted off) Barmby (substituted on) 65'; Hobbs (yellow card) 82'	report	65' Chopra; (yellow card) 68' Bellamy; (yellow card) 76' McPhail; (substituted off) 80' Bellamy (substituted on) Emmanuel-Thomas; (substituted off) 80' Chopra (substituted on) Burke; 90+3' Emmanuel-Thomas	Stadium: KC Stadium; Attendance: 21,441; Referee: Paul Tierney

5 March 2011 35	Cardiff City	0–2	Ipswich Town	Cardiff
17:20 GMT	Emmanuel-Thomas (substituted off) Burke (substituted on) 80'; Quinn (substituted off) Blake (substituted on) 84'; Chopra (substituted off) Parkin (substituted on) 87'	report	(substituted off) 29' Kennedy (substituted on) O'Dea; 67' Bullard; (yellow card) 77' Martin; (substituted off) 84' Scotland (substituted on) Priskin; 86' Bullard; (substituted off) 90+2' Wickham (substituted on) Civelli	Stadium: Cardiff City Stadium; Attendance: 21,347; Referee: Anthony Bates

8 March 2011 36	Crystal Palace	1–0	Cardiff City	London
20:00 GMT	Iversen (substituted off) Couñago (substituted on) 69'; McCarthy (yellow card) 69'; Dikgacoi (yellow card) 74'; Dikgacoi 82'; Vaughan (substituted off) Scannell (substituted on) 89'	report	(substituted off) 80' Chopra (substituted on) Burke; (yellow card) 83' Keinan; (substituted off) 84' Emmanuel-Thomas (substituted on) Parkin	Stadium: Selhurst Park; Attendance: 12,549; Referee: Mick Russell

13 March 2011 37	Cardiff City	2–2	Barnsley	Cardiff
15:00 GMT	Whittingham 21'; Chopra (substituted off) Burke (substituted on) 25'; Emmanuel-Thomas (substituted off) Olofinjana (substituted on) 59'; Bothroyd (substituted off) Parkin (substituted on) 74'; Keinan 83'; Bellamy (yellow card) 90+4'	report	(substituted off) 12' Haynes (substituted on) Gary; 29' Gray; (yellow card) 31' McShane; (substituted off) 63' Mellis (substituted on) O'Brien; (yellow card) 82' Arismendi; (substituted off) 87' Hill (substituted on) Butterfield; 89' Gray	Stadium: Cardiff City Stadium; Attendance: 23,065; Referee: Russell Booth

19 March 2011 38	Millwall	3–3	Cardiff City	London
15:00 GMT	Robinson (yellow card) 25'; Robinson (substituted off) Purse (substituted on) 25'; Townsend (yellow card) 45+6'; Trotter 52' (pen.); Townsend (substituted off) 60' Bouazza (substituted on); Lisbie 62'; Lisbie (substituted off) Harris (substituted on) 78'; Morison 87'; Morison (yellow card) 90+1'; Dunne (yellow card) 90+4'; Dunne (red card) 90+5'	report	(substituted off) 29' Bothroyd (substituted on) Parkin; (substituted off) 42' Hudson (substituted on) Gyepes; 49' Burke; (yellow card) 51' Gyepes; (yellow card) 57' Bellamy; (substituted off) 72' Quinn (substituted on) Blake; 73' Whittingham; 80' Burke	Stadium: The Den; Attendance: 15,039; Referee: Anthony Taylor

2 April 2011 39	Cardiff City	4–1	Derby County	Cardiff
15:00 BST	Bothroyd 7' (pen.); Keinan 48'; McPhail (yellow card) 53'; Quinn 56'; Samuel (yellow card) 63'; Whittingham 68'; Samuel (substituted off) Blake (substituted on) 69'; Bothroyd (substituted off) Parkin (substituted on) 71'; Bellamy (substituted off) Emmanuel-Thomas (substituted on) 76'	report	(yellow card) 6' Barker; (yellow card) 20' Ayala; (substituted off) 37' Green (substituted on) Bailey; (substituted off) 60' Roberts (substituted on) Russell Anderson; (substituted off) 65' Barker (substituted on) Addison; 90+5' (pen.) Savage	Stadium: Cardiff City Stadium; Attendance: 22,254; Referee: James Linington

9 April 2011 40	Doncaster Rovers	1–3	Cardiff City	Doncaster
15:00 BST	Mills (substituted off) Kilgallon (substituted on) 21'; Oster (substituted off) Euell (substituted off) 71'; Coppinger 78'; Gillet (substituted off) Wilson (substituted on) 83'	report	15' Burke; (substituted off) 84' Samuel (substituted on) Naylor; (substituted off) 87' Burke (substituted on) Koumas; 90' Koumas; 90+5' Koumas	Stadium: Keepmoat Stadium; Attendance: 9,174; Referee: Simon Hooper

12 April 2011 41	Sheffield United	0–2	Cardiff City	Sheffield
19:45 BST	Nosworthy (substituted off) Montgomery (substituted on) 46'; Mattock (substituted off) Maguire (substituted on) 48'; Matthew Lowton (yellow card) 65'; Henderson (substituted off) Bent (substituted on) 78'	report	21' Bellamy; (substituted off) 46' Naylor (substituted on) Blake; (substituted off) 48' McPhail (substituted on) Emmanuel-Thomas; 71' Emmanuel-Thomas	Stadium: Bramall Lane; Attendance: 18,230; Referee: Michael Oliver

16 April 2011 42	Cardiff City	3–0	Portsmouth	Cardiff
15:00 BST	Olofinjana 6'; Bothroyd 45+2'; Samuel (yellow card) 61'; Whittingham 73'; Bothroyd (substituted off) Parkin (substituted on) 80'; McPhail (substituted off) Koumas (substituted on) 85'; Quinn (substituted off) Blake (substituted on) 88'	report	(yellow card) 13' Lawrence; (red card) 18' Rocha; (substituted off) 46' Hreiðarsson (substituted on) Mokoena; (yellow card) 60' Nugent; (substituted off) 61' Nugent (substituted on) Dickinson; (substituted off) 63' Cotterill (substituted on) Webber; (yellow card) 88' Kitson	Stadium: Cardiff City Stadium; Attendance: 24,007; Referee: Kevin Wright

23 April 2011 43	Cardiff City	2–2	Queens Park Rangers	Cardiff
12:45 BST	Bothroyd 6'; Whittingham (yellow card) 33'; Bellamy 35'; Quinn (yellow card) 68'; Burke (substituted off) Emmanuel-Thomas (substituted on) 77'; Bellamy (substituted off) Chopra (substituted on) 87'	report	10' Taarabt; (substituted off) 69' Smith (substituted on) Agyemang; 71' Taarabt; (substituted off) 80' Connolly (substituted on) Hall	Stadium: Cardiff City Stadium; Attendance: 26,058; Referee: Lee Mason

25 April 2011 44	Preston North End	0–1	Cardiff City	Preston
15:00 BST	Hume (substituted off) Russell (substituted on) 34'; Cort (substituted off) Barton (substituted on) 58'; Morgan (yellow card) 68'; Ellington (substituted off) Hayes (substituted on) 73'	report	6' Whittingham; (yellow card) 36' Heaton; (substituted off) 47' McNaughton (substituted on) Hudson; (substituted off) 72' Bellamy (substituted on) Chopra; (yellow card) 88' Bothroyd; (yellow card) 90+1' Quinn	Stadium: Deepdale; Attendance: 12,818; Referee: Phil Gibbs

2 May 2011 45	Cardiff City	0–3	Middlesbrough	Cardiff
17:15 BST	Samuel (substituted off) Koumas (substituted on) 31'; Bothroyd (yellow card) 36'; Keinan (yellow card) 38'; McPhail (substituted off) Blake (substituted on) 46'; Quinn (substituted off) Chopra (substituted on) 72'; Bellamy (yellow card) 83'	report	4' Lita; 13'Robson; 21'Smallwood; (yellow card) 25' Hoyte; (yellow card) 56' Smallwood; (yellow card) 57' Thomson; (yellow card) 61' Emnes; (substituted off) 62' Emnes (substituted on) Franks; (yellow card) 67' Williams; (yellow card) 80' Steele; (substituted off) 86' Robson (substituted on) Flood	Stadium: Cardiff City Stadium; Attendance: 25,183; Referee: Graham Scott

8 May 2011 46	Burnley	1–1	Cardiff City	Burnley
12:45 BST	Rodriquez 13'; Bikey (substituted off) Easton (substituted on) 46'; Edgar (yellow card) 67'; Wallace (substituted off) Iwelumo (substituted on) 73'; Mears (yellow card) 87'; Eagles (substituted off) Alexander (substituted on) 88'	report	(substituted off) 30' Hudson (substituted on) Blake; (substituted off) 56' Burke (substituted on) Emmanuel-Thomas; (substituted off) 72' Olofinjana (substituted on) McPhail; (yellow card) 78' Whittingham; 90' Bellamy	Stadium: Turf Moor; Attendance: 14,197; Referee: Colin Webster

==== Play-offs ====
13 May 2011 Semi-final (1st leg)	Reading	0–0	Cardiff City	Reading
19:45 BST	McAnuff (yellow card) 26'; Mills (yellow card) 38'; Robson-Kanu (substituted off) Manset (substituted on) 52'; Hunt (substituted off) Howard (substituted on) 83'	report	(substituted off) 17' Bellamy (substituted on) Chopra; (yellow card) 39' Bothroyd; (substituted off) 83' Quinn (substituted on) Naylor; (substituted off) 90+1' Emmanuel-Thomas (substituted on) Koumas	Stadium: Madjeski Stadium; Attendance: 21,485; Referee: Mark Halsey

17 May 2011 Semi-final (2nd leg)	Cardiff City	0–3	Reading	Cardiff
19:45 BST	Keinan (yellow card) 44'; Emmanuel-Thomas (substituted off) Koumas (substituted on) 60'; Chopra (substituted off) Parkin (substituted on) 64'; Samuel (substituted off) Matthews (substituted on) 68'; Koumas (yellow card) 90+2'	report	28' Long; 45' (pen.) Long; (yellow card) 77' Long; 84' McAnuff; (substituted off) 87' Long (substituted on) Church; (substituted off) 90' Karacan (substituted on) Tabb	Stadium: Cardiff City Stadium; Attendance: 24,081; Referee: Howard Webb

=== FA Cup ===
8 January 2011 Round Three	Stoke City	1–1	Cardiff City	Stoke
15:00 GMT	Tuncay 45'; Pennant (substituted off) Etherington (substituted on) 64'; Walters (substituted off) Jones (substituted on) 74'; Higginbotham (substituted off) Delap (substituted on) 88'	report	8' Chopra; (substituted off) 71' Burke (substituted on) Matthews; (substituted off) 90+6' Keogh (substituted on) Blake	Stadium: Britannia Stadium; Attendance: 18,629; Referee: Mark Halsey

18 January 2011 Round Three (replay)	Cardiff City	0–2	Stoke City	Cardiff
19:45 GMT	McPhail (substituted off) Wildig (substituted on) 39'; Gyepes (yellow card) 63'; Parkin (substituted off) Chopra (substituted on) 64'; Drinkwater (substituted off) Matthews (substituted on) 75'	report	(substituted off) 10' Higginbotham (substituted on) Tonge; (yellow card) 33' Diao; (substituted off) 75' Diao (substituted on) Wilson; (substituted off) 79' Pennant (substituted on) Soares; 92' Walters; (yellow card) 100' Fuller; (yellow card) 109' Pugh; 115' Walters; (yellow card) 166' Walters	Stadium: Cardiff City Stadium; Attendance: 13,671; Referee: Peter Walton

=== Football League Cup ===
11 August 2010 Round One	Cardiff City	4–1 (a.e.t.)	Burton Albion	Cardiff
19:45 BST	Bothroyd 17'; Bothroyd (substituted off) McCormack (substituted on) 46'; Gavin Rae (substituted off) Koumas (substituted on) 67'; McCormack 107', 110'; Chopra 118'	(report)	18' Harrad; (substituted off) 34' Webster (substituted on) Phillips; (yellow card) 36' Penn; (substituted off) 73' Young (substituted on) Preen; (substituted off) 78' Harrad (substituted on) Ellison	Stadium: Cardiff City Stadium; Attendance: 6,080; Referee: Mick Russell

24 August 2010 Round Two	Peterborough United	2–1	Cardiff City	Peterborough
19:45 BST	Mackail-Smith 74'; McCann (yellow card) 82'; Boyd 88'; Davies (substituted off) Lee (substituted on) 90'	(report)	31' Bothroyd; (substituted off) 33' Olofinjana (substituted on) McPhail; (substituted off) 82' McPhail (substituted on) Wildig; (substituted off) 89' Naylor (substituted on) Quinn	Stadium: London Road Stadium; Attendance: 3,806; Referee: David Webb

== Overall summary ==
Games Played	52 (46 Championship, 2 FA Cup, 2 League Cup, 2 Play-offs)
Games Won	24 (23 Championship, 0 FA Cup, 1 League Cup, 0 Play-offs)
Games Drawn	13 (11 Championship, 1 FA Cup, 0 League Cup, 1 Play-offs)
Games Lost	15 (12 Championship, 1 FA Cup, 1 League Cup, 1 Play-offs)
Goals Scored	82 (76 Championship, 1 FA Cup, 5 League Cup, 0 Play-offs)
Goals conceded	63 (54 Championship, 3 FA Cup, 3 League Cup, 3 Play-offs)
Goal Difference	+19
Clean Sheets	14 (13 Championship, 0 FA Cup, 0 League Cup, 1 Play-offs)
Yellow Cards	62 (57 Championship, 1 FA Cup, 0 League Cup, 3 Play-offs)
Red Cards	1 (1 Championship, 0 FA Cup, 0 League Cup, 0 Play-offs)
Worst Discipline	(England) Jay Bothroyd (10 (yellow card) 0 (red card) )
Best Result	4–0 vs Doncaster Rovers; 4–0 vs Leeds United
Worst Result	1–4 vs Watford
Most Appearances	(England) Peter Whittingham, 50 (45 Championship, 1 FA Cup, 2 League Cup, 2 Play-offs)
Top Scorer	(England) Jay Bothroyd, 20 (18 Championship, 0 FA Cup, 2 League Cup, 0 Play-offs)
Points	80 / 132 (60.60%)

League Score Overview

Opposition	Home Score	Away Score	Double
Barnsley	2–2	2 – 1	No
Bristol City	3–2	0 – 3	No
Burnley	1–1	1 – 1	No
Coventry City	2–0	2 – 1	Yes
Crystal Palace	0–0	0 – 1	No
Derby County	4–1	2 – 1	Yes
Doncaster Rovers	4–0	3 – 1	Yes
Hull City	2–0	2 – 0	Yes
Ipswich Town	0–2	0 – 2	No
Leeds United	2–1	4 – 0	Yes
Leicester City	2–0	1 – 2	No
Middlesbrough	0–3	0 – 1	No
Millwall	2–1	3 – 3	No
Norwich City	3–1	1 – 1	No
Nottingham Forest	0–2	1 – 2	No
Portsmouth	3–0	2 – 0	Yes
Preston North End	1–1	1 – 0	No
Queens Park Rangers	2–2	1 – 2	No
Reading	2–2	1 – 1	No
Scunthorpe United	1–0	4 – 2	Yes
Sheffield United	1–1	2 – 0	No
Swansea City	0–1	1 – 0	No
Watford	4–2	1 – 4	No

== Club staff ==
=== Backroom staff ===
Position	Name
Manager	(England) Dave Jones
Assistant manager	(England) Terry Burton
Reserve team manager	(England) Paul Wilkinson
Goalkeeping coach	(Wales) Martyn Margetson
Physio	(England) Sean Connelly
Fitness coach	(England) Alex Armstrong
Club doctor	(Wales) Len Nokes
Kit Manager	Ian Lanning
Masseur	(Wales) Stefan Burnett
Performance analyst	(Republic of Ireland) Enda Barron

=== Board of directors ===
Position	Name
Chairman	(Malaysia) Datuk Chan Tien Ghee
Chief Executive	(Wales) Gethin Jenkins
Finance Director	(Malaysia) Doug Lee
Non-Executive Board Members	(Wales) Steve Borley (England) Paul Guy (Malaysia) U-Jihn Tan (Malaysia) Michael Isaac (England) Alan Whitley

== Honours ==
Individual

- October Football League Championship Manager of the Month: Dave Jones
- October Football League Championship Play of the Month: Jay Bothroyd

=== End-of-season awards ===
Player of the Year	Kevin McNaughton
Young Player of the Year	Tom Heaton
Fan's Player of the Year	Chris Burke
Goal of the Season	Craig Bellamy vs Swansea City, 6 Feb
Moment of the Year	Craig Bellamy's goals vs Doncaster Rovers, 21 Aug

Source: cardiffcity-mad.co.uk,

Team of the Week
Date	Player(s)
7/8 August	Darcy Blake
14/15 August	Seyi Olofinjana
20/21 August	Craig Bellamy & Jay Bothroyd
11 September	Gábor Gyepes
16/17 October	Peter Whittingham
4/5/6 February	Craig Bellamy
12/13 February	Seyi Olofinjana
25/26 February	Aaron Ramsey
12/13 March	Peter Whittingham
18/19 March	Chris Burke
2 April	Dekel Keinan & Peter Whittingham
18 April	Stephen Bywater & Seyi Olofinjana
