= Seyi Olofinjana =

Nigerian footballer (born 1980)

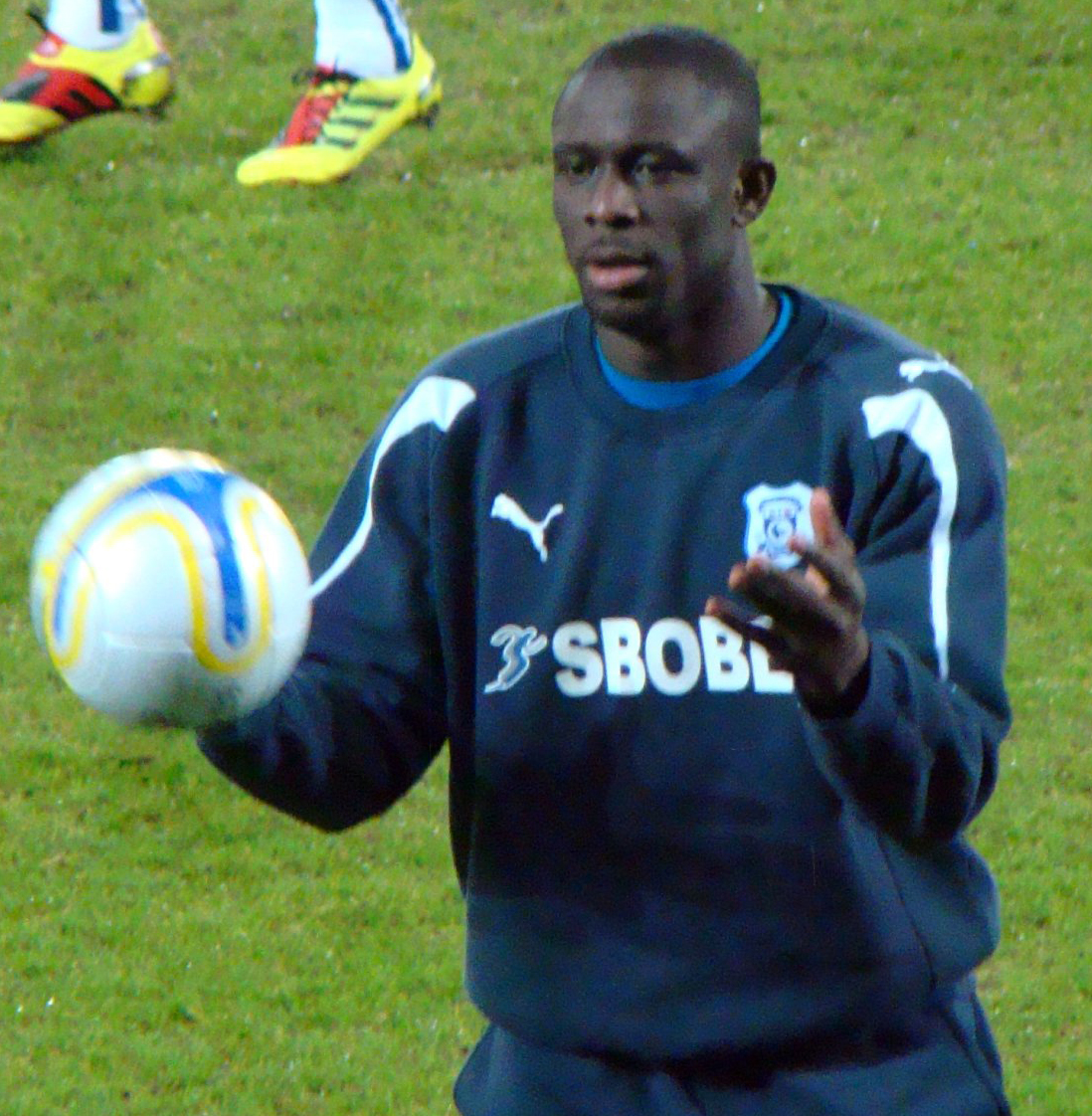
- Olofinjana training with Cardiff City in 2011

Personal information
- Full name: Oluwaseyi George Olofinjana
- Date of birth: 30 June 1980 (age 46)
- Place of birth: Lagos, Nigeria
- Height: 6 ft 4 in (1.93 m)
- Position: Midfielder

Senior career*
Years	Team	Apps	(Gls)
1998–1999	Crown		
1999–2003	Kwara United		
2003–2004	Brann	34	(11)
2004–2008	Wolverhampton Wanderers	135	(16)
2008–2009	Stoke City	18	(2)
2009–2013	Hull City	34	(1)
2010–2011	→ Cardiff City (loan)	39	(6)
2013	→ Sheffield Wednesday (loan)	6	(0)
2013	Sheffield Wednesday	7	(0)
2014	Start	7	(0)
Total		280	(36)

International career
2000–2011	Nigeria	48	(0)
- * Club domestic league appearances and goals

Oluwaseyi George Olofinjana (born 30 June 1980) is a Nigerian former professional footballer who played as a midfielder.

Olofinjana began his career with local sides Crown and Kwara United before moving to Europe with Norwegian side SK Brann. After two seasons at Brann he moved to English club Wolverhampton Wanderers. He became a regular at Molineux making 213 appearances for the club over four seasons before joining Premier League club Stoke City in August 2008 for a fee of £3 million. He played only the 2008–09 season with the team before joining another top flight side, Hull City, again for a fee of £3 million.

== Club career ==
=== Early career ===
Born in Lagos, Olofinjana has a degree in chemical engineering.

He moved from Nigeria to play club football in Norway for Brann.

=== Wolverhampton Wanderers ===
In July 2004 Olofinjana moved to England to sign for Wolverhampton Wanderers for a fee of £1.7 million. After having become a regular player for the club, his second season was curtailed by a back injury that also forced him to miss the 2006 African Cup of Nations. In the 2006–07 season, however, finishing as the club's top league goalscorer as they made the play-offs under Mick McCarthy. He netted Wolves' opening goal of the following campaign in a 2–1 defeat to Watford, but could not repeat his goalscoring level of the previous season, scoring only twice more. He missed part of the season as he competed in the 2008 African Cup of Nations where Nigeria lost in the quarter-finals.

=== Stoke City ===
In June 2008, following Wolves' failure to win promotion, Olofinjana signed for newly promoted Premier League club Stoke City on a four-year deal for £3 million. He scored his first goal for the club in a home game against Everton in September 2008. After making 21 appearances during the season, Stoke accepted a £2.5 million bid in the close season from French side AS Monaco. Negotiations broke down with Monaco, allowing Hull City to sign Olofinjana for £3 million.

=== Hull City ===
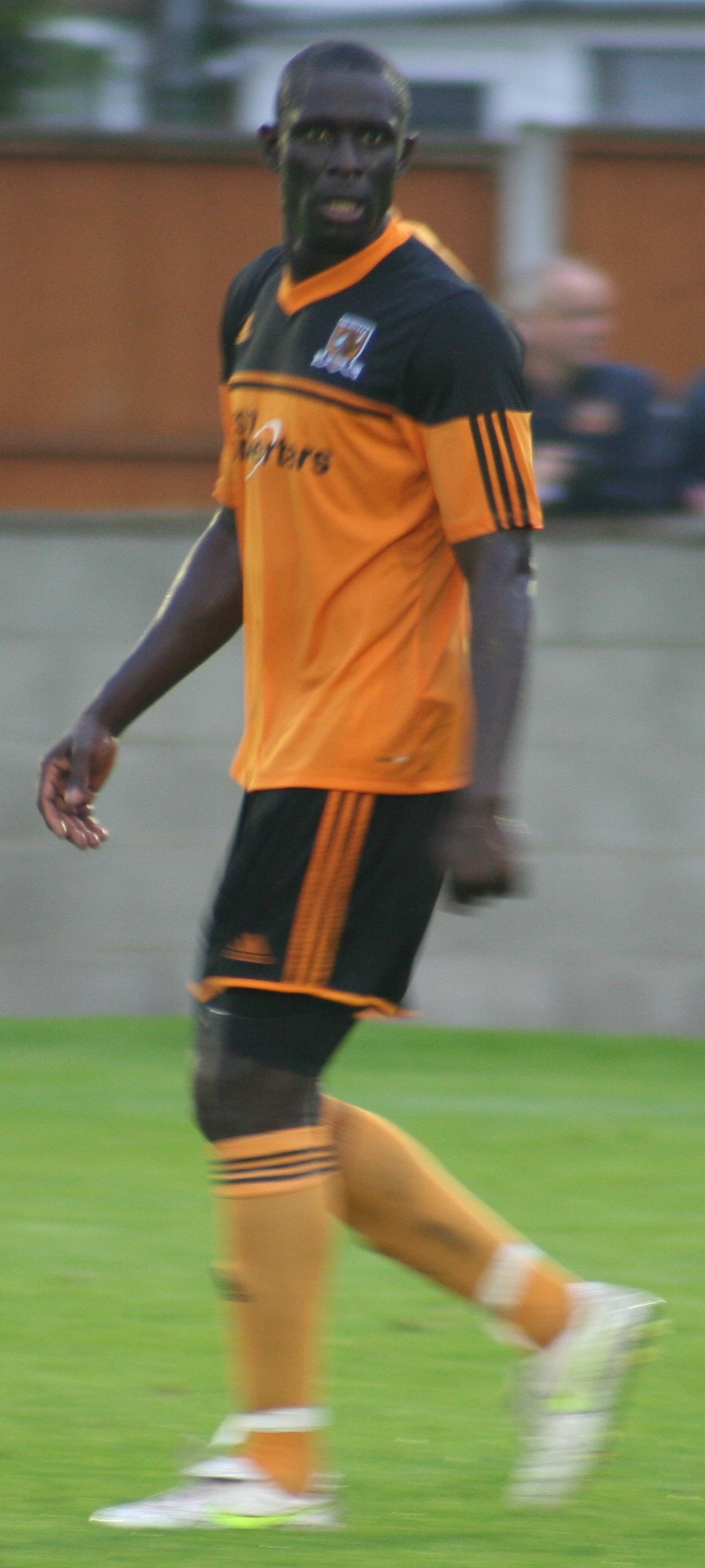
Olofinjana playing for Hull City in 2012

Olofinjana joined the Tigers with the club competing in the top division of English football for the only their second-ever season. He scored his first goal for Hull City in a 2–1 win against his former club, Stoke City in November 2009. However, the team was relegated back to the Championship at the end of the campaign. The midfielder was one of a number of departures during the close season as he agreed a season-long loan at fellow Championship team Cardiff City.

At the Welsh club, Olofinjana was reunited with Dave Jones, who had originally brought him into English football when manager of Wolves. The midfielder featured regularly as the team reached the promotion play-offs but lost to Reading. After a total of 42 senior appearances for Cardiff, including their two games in the play-offs, it was announced that he would return to Hull following the loan spell.

Back at Hull, a lengthy knee injury meant that Olofinjana made only five appearances during the 2011–12 season. Although he featured more regularly for the club during the following campaign, he was unable to retain a regular place in their team and was instead loaned out to Sheffield Wednesday in March 2013 until the season's conclusion.

At the conclusion of the 2012–13 season Olofinjana's contract with Hull City expired, leaving him a free agent. He left having made 40 appearances during a four-season stay.

=== Sheffield Wednesday ===
Following his release from Hull, Olofinjana joined Sheffield Wednesday on 26 October 2013 and played in a 1–1 draw against Barnsley.

After making four appearances, Olofinjana had his loan spell with Sheffield Wednesday extended for another month. Olofinjana made seven appearances and made his last appearance for the club as an unused substitute on 26 December 2013, in a match against Blackburn Rovers. On the same day, Olofinjana apparently left the club upon the expiry of his contract.

=== Start ===
After spending eight months without a club, Olofinjana joined Start in Tippeligaen until the season, where he will be reunited with Mons Ivar Mjelde, who he knew during his time at Brann.

== International career ==
Olofinjana made his debut for the Nigeria national team on 6 June 2000 in a friendly against Malawi, with Nigeria winning the match 4–1.

He participated in the 2004 African Cup of Nations, held in Tunisia in 2004. During the group stage, Nigeria secured victories over South Africa and Benin. In the quarter-finals, they defeated Cameroon 2–1 to advance to the semi-finals. However, they drew 1–1 with hosts Tunisia in the semi-final before losing 5–3 in a penalty shoot-out. Nigeria went on to win the third-place play-off and finish third in the tournament.

He did not participate in the 2006 Africa Cup of Nations, held in Egypt. He subsequently featured in the 2008 Africa Cup of Nations in Ghana, appearing in matches against Ivory Coast, Mali, and hosts Ghana. Nigeria were eliminated in the quarter-finals after losing 2–1 to Ghana.

At the 2010 Africa Cup of Nations in Angola, Olofinjana was included in the national team squad during the group stage and knockout rounds. He started the third-place play-off against Algeria and played the entire match. Nigeria won 1–0 to secure third place in the tournament.

Olofinjana was part of the Nigerian national team during the 2010 FIFA World Cup qualification campaign. He also wore the captain's armband on several occasions. However, he was not included in the final squad for the tournament. In a 2026 interview, he stated that despite his performances during the qualifying campaign and having captained the team several times, he was never given an explanation for his exclusion from the final squad.

His final appearance for the national team came on 29 March 2011 in a friendly against Kenya, with Nigeria winning 3–0.

== After retirement ==
In August 2015 Olofinjana started working at Wolverhampton Wanderers's Academy. In February 2019, he was the Loans Pathway Manager at the club.

He is a graduate of Manchester Metropolitan University's Masters of Sport Directorship programme.

In April 2021, Olofinjana left Wolves for Swiss side Grasshopper Club Zürich, becoming their new sporting director. He resigned and left on 20 June 2022. In June 2024, Olofinjana was appointed the head of scouting by Premier League club, Chelsea. He was tasked with the responsibility of identifying talents from Africa.

== Career statistics ==
=== Club ===
Appearances and goals by club, season and competition
Club	Season	League			National cup		League cup		Other		Total	
Club	Season	Division	Apps	Goals	Apps	Goals	Apps	Goals	Apps	Goals	Apps	Goals
Brann	2003	Tippeligaen	25	9	3	0	—		—		28	9
Brann	2004	Tippeligaen	9	2	2	0	—		—		11	2
Brann	Total		34	11	4	0	—		0	0	38	11
Wolverhampton Wanderers	2004–05	Championship	42	5	2	0	2	0	—		46	5
Wolverhampton Wanderers	2005–06	Championship	13	0	0	0	1	0	—		14	0
Wolverhampton Wanderers	2006–07	Championship	44	8	3	1	1	0	2 (Note: Appearances in Championship play-offs)	1	50	10
Wolverhampton Wanderers	2007–08	Championship	36	3	1	0	0	0	—		37	3
Wolverhampton Wanderers	Total		135	16	6	1	4	0	2	1	147	18
Stoke City	2008–09	Premier League	18	2	1	0	2	0	—		21	2
Hull City	2009–10	Premier League	19	1	0	0	0	0	—		19	1
Hull City	2010–11	Championship	0	0	0	0	0	0	—		0	0
Hull City	2011–12	Championship	3	0	2	0	0	0	—		5	0
Hull City	2012–13	Championship	12	0	3	0	1	0	—		16	0
Hull City	Total		34	1	5	0	1	0	0	0	40	1
Cardiff City (loan)	2010–11	Championship	39	6	0	0	1	0	2	0	42	6
Sheffield Wednesday (loan)	2012–13	Championship	6	0	0	0	0	0	—		6	0
Sheffield Wednesday	2013–14	Championship	7	0	0	0	0	0	—		7	0
Start	2014	Tippeligaen	7	0	0	0	—		—		7	0
Career total			280	36	17	1	8	0	4	1	307	38

=== International ===
Appearances and goals by national team and year
National team	Year	Apps	Goals
Nigeria	2002	2	0
Nigeria	2003	4	0
Nigeria	2004	12	0
Nigeria	2005	5	0
Nigeria	2006	2	0
Nigeria	2007	7	0
Nigeria	2008	7	0
Nigeria	2009	8	0
Nigeria	2010	1	0
Total		48	0

== Honors ==
Nigeria

- Africa Cup of Nations third place:2010
