= 2006–07 Wolverhampton Wanderers F.C. season =

English football club season

Wolverhampton Wanderers
2006–07 season
- Chairman: Sir Jack Hayward
- Manager: Mick McCarthy
- Championship: 5th (lost in play-offs)
- FA Cup: 4th round
- League Cup: 2nd round
- Top goalscorer: League: Jay Bothroyd (9); All: Seyi Olofinjana (10)
- Highest home attendance: 28,107 (vs. West Bromwich Albion, 28 January 2007)
- Lowest home attendance: 14,524 (vs. Oldham Athletic, 6 January 2007)
- Average home league attendance: 20,968 (league only)

The 2006–07 season was the 108th season of competitive league football in the history of English football club Wolverhampton Wanderers. They played the season in the second tier of the English football system, the Football League Championship.

== Season summary ==
The season was the first under new manager Mick McCarthy who replaced Glenn Hoddle after the latter resigned suddenly in July 2006. McCarthy's appointment coincided with a new approach by the club after their parachute payments stemming from their Premier League relegation two years earlier ceased. After numerous senior players departed under these new financial conditions, a fresh ethos of recruiting younger players from lower league sides emerged.

The team finished fifth, qualifying for the play-offs. Their promotion hopes were ended by local rivals West Bromwich Albion - whom they met a record five times during the campaign - who beat them in both legs of the play-off semi finals to win 4–2 on aggregate.

== Results ==
=== Preseason ===
| 10 July 2006 | Hednesford Town | 0–4 | Wolverhampton Wanderers | Hednesford |
| 19:30 BST | | Report | Finkler 45', 69'; Gleeson 67'; Collins 90' | Stadium: Keys Park; Attendance: 1,507; Referee: Andy Garratt |

| 11 July 2006 | Telford United | 0–0 | Wolverhampton Wanderers | Telford |
| 19:30 BST | | Report | | Stadium: New Bucks Head; Attendance: 2,229; Referee: Ray Olivier |

| 15 July 2006 | Burton Albion | 1–0 | Wolverhampton Wanderers | Burton upon Trent |
| 15:00 BST | Clare 60' | Report | | Stadium: Pirelli Stadium; Attendance: 1,293; Referee: Ray Olivier |

| 18 July 2006 | Tranmere Rovers | 2–2 | Wolverhampton Wanderers | Birkenhead |
| 19:45 BST | Greenacre 14'; McAteer 84' | Report | Rósa 5'; Cort 63' | Stadium: Prenton Park; Attendance: 2,422; Referee: Steve Cummins |

| 22 July 2006 | Swansea City | 1–1 | Wolverhampton Wanderers | Swansea |
| 15:00 BST | Fallon 3' | Report | Edwards 25' | Stadium: Liberty Stadium; Attendance: 6,971; Referee: Ceri Richards |

| 26 July 2006 | Crewe Alexandra | 0–2 | Wolverhampton Wanderers | Crewe |
| 19:30 BST | | Report | O'Connor 43'; Finkler 69' | Stadium: Gresty Road; Attendance: 1,857; Referee: Scott Mathieson |

| 29 July 2006 | Wolverhampton Wanderers | 0–3 | Aston Villa | Wolverhampton |
| 15:00 BST | | Report | Ridgewell 32'; Barry 52'; Agbonlahor 66' | Stadium: Molineux; Attendance: 13,765 (3,592 away); Referee: Steve Bratt |

=== Football League Championship ===
A total of 24 teams competed in the Championship during the 2006–07 season. Each team would play every other team twice, once at their stadium, and once at the opposition's. Three points were awarded to teams for each win, one point per draw, and none for defeats. The provisional fixture list was released on 22 June 2006, but was subject to change in the event of matches being selected for television coverage or police concerns.

| 5 August 2006 1 | Plymouth Argyle | 1–1 | Wolverhampton Wanderers | Plymouth |
| 15:00 BST | Hayles 35' | Report | Kouo-Doumbé 47' (o.g.) | Stadium: Home Park; Attendance: 15,964 (1,476 away); Referee: Iain Williamson |

| 8 August 2006 2 | Wolverhampton Wanderers | 1–0 | Ipswich Town | Wolverhampton |
| 19:45 BST | Bothroyd 27' | Report | Richards (penalty missed) 45+1' | Stadium: Molineux; Attendance: 19,199 (1,301 away); Referee: Trevor Kettle |

| 11 August 2006 3 | Wolverhampton Wanderers | 1–3 | Preston North End | Wolverhampton |
| 19:45 BST | Bothroyd 14' | Report | Nugent 23', 65'; Whaley 90+3' | Stadium: Molineux; Attendance: 17,410 (525 away); Referee: Uriah Rennie |

| 19 August 2006 4 | Burnley | 0–1 | Wolverhampton Wanderers | Burnley |
| 15:00 BST | | Report | Johnson 19' | Stadium: Turf Moor; Attendance: 12,245 (943 away); Referee: Clive Oliver |

| 26 August 2006 5 | Wolverhampton Wanderers | 1–0 | Luton Town | Wolverhampton |
| 15:00 BST | Johnson 47' | Report | | Stadium: Molineux; Attendance: 19,378 (1,218 away); Referee: Paul Robinson |

| 10 September 2006 6 | Leeds United | 0–1 | Wolverhampton Wanderers | Leeds |
| 13:15 BST | | Report | Bothroyd 90+2' | Stadium: Elland Road; Attendance: 16,268 (1,524 away); Referee: Lee Mason |

| 12 September 2006 7 | Wolverhampton Wanderers | 0–1 | Derby County | Wolverhampton |
| 19:45 BST | Bothroyd (penalty missed) 24' | Report | Howard 34' | Stadium: Molineux; Attendance: 21,546 (1,104 away); Referee: Neil Swarbrick |

| 16 September 2006 8 | Barnsley | 1–0 | Wolverhampton Wanderers | Barnsley |
| 15:00 BST | Richards 10' | Report | | Stadium: Oakwell; Attendance: 11,350 (1,884 away); Referee: Nigel Miller |

| 23 September 2006 9 | Wolverhampton Wanderers | 2–0 | Stoke City | Wolverhampton |
| 15:00 BST | Clarke 21'; Olofinjana 68' | Report | | Stadium: Molineux; Attendance: 19,489 (907 away); Referee: Mike Dean |

| 30 September 2006 10 | Cardiff City | 4–0 | Wolverhampton Wanderers | Cardiff |
| 15:00 BST | Scimeca 40'; Craddock 50' (o.g.); Kamara 70'; Parry 78' | Report | | Stadium: Ninian Park; Attendance: 19,915 (1,569 away); Referee: Pat Miller |

| 14 October 2006 11 | Wolverhampton Wanderers | 1–0 | Colchester United | Wolverhampton |
| 15:00 BST | Bothroyd 51' | Report | | Stadium: Molineux; Attendance: 19,318 (679 away); Referee: Scott Mathieson |

| 17 October 2006 12 | Wolverhampton Wanderers | 1–0 | Coventry City | Wolverhampton |
| 19:45 BST | Ward 20' (o.g.) | Report | | Stadium: Molineux; Attendance: 19,823 (1,641 away); Referee: Lee Mason |

| 22 October 2006 13 | West Bromwich Albion | 3–0 | Wolverhampton Wanderers | West Bromwich |
| 12:00 BST | Greening 11'; Kamara 27'; Hartson 85' (pen.) | Report | | Stadium: The Hawthorns; Attendance: 26,606 (2,600 away); Referee: Howard Webb |

| 28 October 2006 14 | Wolverhampton Wanderers | 2–2 | Sheffield Wednesday | Wolverhampton |
| 15:00 BST | Clarke 30', 73' | Report | Small 36'; Brunt 53' | Stadium: Molineux; Attendance: 20,637 (1,086 away); Referee: Rob Lewis |

| 1 November 2006 15 | Southampton | 2–0 | Wolverhampton Wanderers | Southampton |
| 19:45 GMT | Wright-Phillips 39'; Jones 70' | Report | | Stadium: St Mary's Stadium; Attendance: 18,979 (1,005 away); Referee: Mike Thorpe |

| 4 November 2006 16 | Wolverhampton Wanderers | 3–1 | Southend United | Wolverhampton |
| 15:00 GMT | Clarke 10', 22'; Craddock 12' | Report | Harrold 57' | Stadium: Molineux; Attendance: 17,904 (840 away); Referee: Steve Tanner |

| 11 November 2006 17 | Hull City | 2–0 | Wolverhampton Wanderers | Kingston upon Hull |
| 15:00 GMT | Fagan 13'; Elliott 75' | Report | | Stadium: KC Stadium; Attendance: 16,962 (832 away); Referee: Uriah Rennie |

| 18 November 2006 18 | Birmingham City | 1–1 | Wolverhampton Wanderers | Birmingham |
| 12:00 GMT | McSheffrey 30' | Report | Craddock 89' | Stadium: St Andrew's; Attendance: 22,256 (2,663 away); Referee: Mark Halsey |

| 24 November 2006 19 | Wolverhampton Wanderers | 1–1 | Sunderland | Wolverhampton |
| 20:00 GMT | Johnson 43' | Report | Elliott 80' | Stadium: Molineux; Attendance: 27,203 (2,347 away); Referee: Mike Pike |

| 28 November 2006 20 | Wolverhampton Wanderers | 1–1 | Crystal Palace | Wolverhampton |
| 19:45 GMT | Gobern 63' | Report | Freedman 84' | Stadium: Molineux; Attendance: 17,806 (602 away); Referee: Keith Stroud |

| 2 December 2006 21 | Southend United | 0–1 | Wolverhampton Wanderers | Southend-on-Sea |
| 15:00 GMT | | Report | Craddock 61' | Stadium: Roots Hall; Attendance: 9,411 (2,000 away); Referee: Paul Armstrong |

| 9 December 2006 22 | Wolverhampton Wanderers | 1–2 | Leicester City | Wolverhampton |
| 15:00 GMT | Gobern 81' | Report | Hammond 38'; Porter 90' | Stadium: Molineux; Attendance: 18,600 (1,454 away); Referee: Phil Dowd |

| 16 December 2006 23 | Queens Park Rangers | 0–1 | Wolverhampton Wanderers | London |
| 15:00 GMT | | Report | Kightly 49' | Stadium: Loftus Road; Attendance: 12,323 (1,527 away); Referee: Chris Foy |

| 23 December 2006 24 | Wolverhampton Wanderers | 2–2 | Norwich City | Wolverhampton |
| 15:00 GMT | Henry 36'; Craddock 90+3' | Report | Earnshaw 10', 77' | Stadium: Molineux; Attendance: 22,910 (483 away); Referee: Phil Joslin |

| 26 December 2006 25 | Derby County | 0–2 | Wolverhampton Wanderers | Derby |
| 15:00 GMT | | Report | Olofinjana 66'; Kightly 90+2' | Stadium: Pride Park; Attendance: 31,920 (2,341 away); Referee: Trevor Kettle |

| 30 December 2006 26 | Colchester United | 2–1 | Wolverhampton Wanderers | Colchester |
| 15:00 GMT | Cureton 4'; Iwelumo 45' | Report | Collins 90+2' | Stadium: Layer Road; Attendance: 5,893 (1,000 away); Referee: Richard Beeby |

| 1 January 2007 27 | Wolverhampton Wanderers | 2–0 | Barnsley | Wolverhampton |
| 15:00 GMT | Potter (penalty missed) 29'; Henry 52'; Olofinjana 78' | Report | | Stadium: Molineux; Attendance: 20,064 (790 away); Referee: Andy Woolmer |

| 13 January 2007 28 | Stoke City | 1–1 | Wolverhampton Wanderers | Stoke-on-Trent |
| 15:00 GMT | Hill 85' | Report | Collins 63' | Stadium: Britannia Stadium; Attendance: 15,882 (2,756 away); Referee: Peter Walton |

| 20 January 2007 29 | Wolverhampton Wanderers | 1–2 | Cardiff City | Wolverhampton |
| 13:00 GMT | Olofinjana 58' | Report | Chopra 27'; Byrne 88' | Stadium: Molineux; Attendance: 16,772 (0 away); Referee: Jon Moss |

| 30 January 2007 30 | Norwich City | 0–1 | Wolverhampton Wanderers | Norwich |
| 19:45 GMT | | Report | Kightly 53' | Stadium: Carrow Road; Attendance: 23,311 (699 away); Referee: Nigel Miller |

| 3 February 2007 31 | Wolverhampton Wanderers | 2–2 | Plymouth Argyle | Wolverhampton |
| 15:00 GMT | Ward 33'; Olofinjana 69' | Report | Sinclair 27'; Timár 36' | Stadium: Molineux; Attendance: 19,082 (1,185 away); Referee: Steve Bennett |

| 10 February 2007 32 | Preston North End | 0–1 | Wolverhampton Wanderers | Preston |
| 15:00 GMT | | Report | Olofinjana 8' | Stadium: Deepdale; Attendance: 15,748 (1,856 away); Referee: Graham Laws |

| 17 February 2007 33 | Wolverhampton Wanderers | 2–1 | Burnley | Wolverhampton |
| 15:00 GMT | Kightly 5'; Ward 40' | Report | McCann 53' | Stadium: Molineux; Attendance: 19,521 (655 away); Referee: Kevin Friend |

| 20 February 2007 34 | Ipswich Town | 0–1 | Wolverhampton Wanderers | Ipswich |
| 19:45 GMT | | Report | Ward 33' | Stadium: Portman Road; Attendance: 20,602 (961 away); Referee: Scott Mathieson |

| 24 February 2007 35 | Wolverhampton Wanderers | 1–0 | Leeds United | Wolverhampton |
| 15:00 GMT | Kightly 76' | Report | | Stadium: Molineux; Attendance: 24,314 (2,600 away); Referee: Mike Jones |

| 3 March 2007 36 | Luton Town | 2–3 | Wolverhampton Wanderers | Luton |
| 15:00 GMT | Emanuel 22'; Barnett 45' | Report | Breen 10'; Keogh 53'; Henry 66' | Stadium: Kenilworth Road; Attendance: 10,002 (1,800 away); Referee: Paul Taylor |

| 11 March 2007 37 | Wolverhampton Wanderers | 1–0 | West Bromwich Albion | Wolverhampton |
| 12:00 GMT | Bothroyd 83' | Report | | Stadium: Molineux; Attendance: 28,016 (2,600 away); Referee: Andy D'Urso |

| 13 March 2007 38 | Coventry City | 2–1 | Wolverhampton Wanderers | Coventry |
| 12:00 GMT | Adebola 26'; Ward 71' | Report | Kightly 45+2' | Stadium: Ricoh Arena; Attendance: 22,099 (5,155 away); Referee: Peter Walton |

| 17 March 2007 39 | Sheffield Wednesday | 2–2 | Wolverhampton Wanderers | Sheffield |
| 15:00 GMT | Burton 22'; MacLean 47' | Report | McIndoe 35'; Keogh 90+1' | Stadium: Hillsborough; Attendance: 24,181 (2,500 away); Referee: Jon Moss |

| 31 March 2007 40 | Wolverhampton Wanderers | 0–6 | Southampton | Wolverhampton |
| 15:00 GMT | Kightly (penalty missed) 45+1' | Report | Saganowski 24', 36', 83'; Breen 27' (o.g.); Best 55'; Surman 79' | Stadium: Molineux; Attendance: 24,804 (1,672 away); Referee: Graham Salisbury |

| 7 April 2007 41 | Sunderland | 2–1 | Wolverhampton Wanderers | Sunderland |
| 15:00 BST | Murphy 15'; Wallace 63' | Report | Keogh 65' | Stadium: Stadium of Light; Attendance: 40,748 (4,186 away); Referee: Neil Swarbrick |

| 9 April 2007 42 | Wolverhampton Wanderers | 3–1 | Hull City | Wolverhampton |
| 15:00 BST | Bothroyd 18', 47'; Olofinjana 39' | Report | Forster 61' | Stadium: Molineux; Attendance: 20,772 (596 away); Referee: Phil Joslin |

| 14 April 2007 43 | Crystal Palace | 2–2 | Wolverhampton Wanderers | London |
| 15:00 BST | Hudson 12'; McAnuff 37' | Report | Bothroyd 13', 22' | Stadium: Selhurst Park; Attendance: 17,981 (1,820 away); Referee: Mike Thorpe |

| 22 April 2007 44 | Wolverhampton Wanderers | 2–3 | Birmingham City | Wolverhampton |
| 12:00 BST | McIndoe 67', 71' (penalty missed) 90+3' | Report | Cole 54'; Bendtner 77'; Jerome 88' | Stadium: Molineux; Attendance: 22,754 (2,176 away); Referee: Graham Laws |

| 28 April 2007 45 | Wolverhampton Wanderers | 2–0 | Queens Park Rangers | Wolverhampton |
| 15:00 BST | Keogh 57'; Kightly 64' | Report | | Stadium: Molineux; Attendance: 24,931 (1,386 away); Referee: Mike Pike |

| 6 May 2007 46 | Leicester City | 1–4 | Wolverhampton Wanderers | Leicester |
| 13:00 BST | Hume 3' | Report | Olofinjana 25'; Kightly 33'; McAuley 53' (o.g.); Keogh 86' (pen.) | Stadium: Walkers Stadium; Attendance: 30,282 (3,300 away); Referee: Mike Dean |

Final table

| Pos | Team | Pld | W | D | L | GF | GA | GD | Pts |
|---|---|---|---|---|---|---|---|---|---|
| 1 | Sunderland | 46 | 27 | 7 | 12 | 76 | 47 | +29 | 88 |
| 2 | Birmingham City | 46 | 26 | 8 | 12 | 67 | 42 | +25 | 86 |
| 3 | Derby County | 46 | 25 | 9 | 12 | 62 | 46 | +16 | 84 |
| 4 | West Bromwich Albion | 46 | 22 | 10 | 14 | 81 | 55 | +26 | 76 |
| 5 | Wolverhampton Wanderers | 46 | 22 | 10 | 14 | 59 | 56 | +3 | 76 |
| 6 | Southampton | 46 | 21 | 12 | 13 | 77 | 53 | +24 | 75 |
| 7 | Preston North End | 46 | 22 | 8 | 16 | 64 | 53 | +11 | 74 |

Results summary

| Overall | | | | | | | | Home | | | | | | Away | | | | | |
| Pld | W | D | L | GF | GA | GD | Pts | W | D | L | GF | GA | GD | W | D | L | GF | GA | GD |
|---|---|---|---|---|---|---|---|---|---|---|---|---|---|---|---|---|---|---|---|
| 46 | 22 | 10 | 14 | 59 | 56 | +3 | 76 | 12 | 5 | 6 | 33 | 28 | +5 | 10 | 5 | 8 | 26 | 28 | −2 |

Source: Statto.com

Results by round

| Round | 1 | 2 | 3 | 4 | 5 | 6 | 7 | 8 | 9 | 10 | 11 | 12 | 13 | 14 | 15 | 16 | 17 | 18 | 19 | 20 | 21 | 22 | 23 | 24 | 25 | 26 | 27 | 28 | 29 | 30 | 31 | 32 | 33 | 34 | 35 | 36 | 37 | 38 | 39 | 40 | 41 | 42 | 43 | 44 | 45 | 46 |
|---|---|---|---|---|---|---|---|---|---|---|---|---|---|---|---|---|---|---|---|---|---|---|---|---|---|---|---|---|---|---|---|---|---|---|---|---|---|---|---|---|---|---|---|---|---|---|
| Result | D | W | L | W | W | W | L | L | W | L | W | W | L | D | L | W | L | D | D | D | W | L | W | D | W | L | W | D | L | W | D | W | W | W | W | W | W | L | D | L | L | W | D | L | W | W |
| Position | 9 | 7 | 11 | 10 | 4 | 3 | 3 | 8 | 6 | 8 | 5 | 4 | 6 | 7 | 7 | 6 | 8 | 10 | 7 | 13 | 9 | 14 | 10 | 10 | 9 | 10 | 9 | 10 | 10 | 10 | 10 | 9 | 8 | 8 | 8 | 5 | 4 | 5 | 5 | 6 | 7 | 5 | 6 | 6 | 5 | 5 |

Source: Statto.com
W = Win; D = Draw; L = Loss

=== Play-offs ===
| 13 May 2007 SF 1st leg | Wolverhampton Wanderers | 2–3 | West Bromwich Albion | Wolverhampton |
| 12:00 BST | Craddock 44'; Olofinjana 52' | Report | Phillips 25', 54'; Kamara 73' | Stadium: Molineux; Attendance: 27,750 (2,600 away); Referee: Steve Tanner |

| 16 May 2007 SF 2nd leg | West Bromwich Albion | 1–0 (4–2 agg.) | Wolverhampton Wanderers | West Bromwich |
| 19:45 BST | Phillips 65' | Report | | Stadium: The Hawthorns; Attendance: 27,415 (2,600 away); Referee: Mark Halsey |

=== FA Cup ===
| 6 January 2007 R3 | Wolverhampton Wanderers | 2–2 | Oldham Athletic | Wolverhampton |
| 15:00 GMT | Olofinjana 35'; Davies 42' | Report | Warne 19'; Hall 78' | Stadium: Molineux; Attendance: 14,524 (2,600 away); Referee: Phil Crossley |

| 16 January 2007 R3 Rep. | Oldham Athletic | 0–2 | Wolverhampton Wanderers | Oldham |
| 19:45 GMT | | Report | Potter 56'; Davies 75' | Stadium: Boundary Park; Attendance: 9,628 (2,176 away); Referee: Kevin Wright |

| 28 January 2007 R4 | Wolverhampton Wanderers | 0–3 | West Bromwich Albion | Wolverhampton |
| 12:00 GMT | | Report | Kamara 44'; Phillips 49'; Gera 78' | Stadium: Molineux; Attendance: 28,107 (5,500 away); Referee: Uriah Rennie |

=== League Cup ===
| 23 August 2006 R1 | Chesterfield | 0–0 (a.e.t.) (6–5 p) | Wolverhampton Wanderers | Chesterfield |
| 19:30 BST | | Report | | Stadium: Saltergate; Attendance: 4,136 (586 away); Referee: Phil Joslin |
| | Penalties |
| | Hurst (penalty scored); Picken (penalty scored); Bailey (penalty missed); Allison (penalty scored); Niven (penalty scored); Folan (penalty scored); Allott (penalty scored) | | (penalty scored) Johnson; (penalty scored) Ricketts; (penalty scored) Potter; (penalty scored) Clapham; (penalty missed) Henry; (penalty scored) Clarke; (penalty missed) Craddock |

== Players ==
=== Statistics ===
Key:
‡ On loan from another club * First appearance(s) for the club

- # = Squad number
- Pos = Playing position
- P = Number of games played
- G = Number of goals scored
- GK = Goalkeeper
- DF = Defender
- MF = Midfielder
- FW = Forward
- = Yellow cards
- = Red cards
- † Permanent player left club during the season
- ¤ Loaned to another club for part or all of season

Correct as of end of season. Starting appearances are listed first, followed by substitute appearances in parentheses where applicable.

| No. | Pos | Name | P | G | P | G | P | G | P | G | A yellow card | A red card | Notes |
| No. | Pos | Name | League | | FA Cup | | League Cup | | Total | | Discipline | | Notes |
|---|---|---|---|---|---|---|---|---|---|---|---|---|---|
| 1 | GK | (England) Michael Oakes | 0 | 0 | 0 | 0 | 0 | 0 | 0 | 0 | 0 | 0 | |
| 2 | DF | (Northern Ireland) Mark Clyde † | 3 | 0 | 0 | 0 | 0 | 0 | 3 | 0 | 0 | 0 | |
| 3 | DF | (England) Lee Naylor † | 3 | 0 | 0 | 0 | 0 | 0 | 3 | 0 | 0 | 0 | |
| 3 | DF | (Scotland) Neill Collins ‡ | 22(2) | 2 | 3 | 0 | 0 | 0 | 25(2) | 2 | 3 | 0 | (Note: Loanee who was signed permanently during the season.) |
| 4 | MF | (Nigeria) Seyi Olofinjana | 43(3) | 9 | 3 | 1 | 1 | 0 | 47(3) | 10 | 7 | 0 | |
| 5 | DF | (Republic of Ireland) Gary Breen | 42 | 1 | 3 | 0 | 0 | 0 | 45 | 1 | 7 | 2 | |
| 6 | DF | (England) Jody Craddock (c) | 30(6) | 5 | 0 | 0 | 1 | 0 | 31(6) | 5 | 4 | 0 | |
| 7 | DF | (Scotland) Jackie McNamara | 21 | 0 | 2 | 0 | 0 | 0 | 23 | 0 | 5 | 2 | |
| 8 | MF | (England) Karl Henry | 34 | 3 | 3 | 0 | 0(1) | 0 | 37(1) | 3 | 6 | 0 | |
| 9 | FW | (Guyana) Carl Cort | 7(3) | 0 | 0 | 0 | 0 | 0 | 7(3) | 0 | 0 | 1 | |
| 10 | FW | (England) Jay Bothroyd | 21(14) | 9 | 0 | 0 | 0 | 0 | 21(14) | 9 | 4 | 0 | |
| 11 | DF | (England) Jamie Clapham | 21(5) | 0 | 1 | 0 | 1 | 0 | 23(5) | 0 | 2 | 0 | |
| 12 | DF | (Wales) Rob Edwards | 24(9) | 0 | 0(2) | 0 | 1 | 0 | 25(11) | 0 | 6 | 0 | |
| 13 | FW | (United States) Jemal Johnson ¤ | 14(6) | 3 | 0(3) | 0 | 0(1) | 0 | 14(10) | 3 | 2 | 0 | |
| 14 | MF | (Republic of Ireland) Darren Potter ‡ | 37(3) | 0 | 3 | 1 | 1 | 0 | 41(3) | 1 | 7 | 0 | |
| 15 | MF | (Hungary) Dénes Rósa ¤ | 0 | 0 | 0 | 0 | 1 | 0 | 1 | 0 | 0 | 0 | |
| 16 | MF | (England) Mark Davies | 0(7) | 0 | 0(3) | 0 | 0 | 0 | 0(10) | 0 | 0 | 0 | |
| 17 | FW | (England) Leon Clarke † | 11(11) | 5 | 0 | 0 | 0(1) | 0 | 11(12) | 5 | 2 | 0 | |
| 17 | FW | (Republic of Ireland) Stephen Ward | 11(9) | 3 | 0(1) | 0 | 0 | 0 | 11(10) | 3 | 0 | 0 | |
| 18 | FW | (Wales) Craig Davies ‡ | 6(17) | 0 | 3 | 2 | 1 | 0 | 10(17) | 2 | 0 | 0 | |
| 19 | MF | (Brazil) Guilherme Finkler ‡ | 0 | 0 | 0 | 0 | 0 | 0 | 0 | 0 | 0 | 0 | |
| 20 | GK | (England) Matt Murray | 44 | 0 | 3 | 0 | 0 | 0 | 47 | 0 | 0 | 0 | |
| 21 | FW | (Poland) Tomasz Frankowski ¤ | 0 | 0 | 0 | 0 | 1 | 0 | 1 | 0 | 0 | 0 | |
| 22 | MF | (England) Lewis Gobern | 6(6) | 2 | 0 | 0 | 0 | 0 | 6(6) | 2 | 0 | 0 | |
| 23 | DF | (England) Keith Lowe ¤ | 0 | 0 | 0 | 0 | 0 | 0 | 0 | 0 | 0 | 0 | |
| 24 | DF | (Hungary) Gábor Gyepes † | 0 | 0 | 0 | 0 | 0 | 0 | 0 | 0 | 0 | 0 | (Note: Contract terminated by mutual consent to allow injury rehabilitation back in his homeland.) |
| 25 | DF | (England) Daniel Jones | 8 | 0 | 0 | 0 | 0 | 0 | 8 | 0 | 1 | 0 | |
| 26 | DF | (England) Mark Little | 19(8) | 0 | 3 | 0 | 1 | 0 | 23(8) | 0 | 4 | 1 | |
| 27 | DF | (Scotland) Charlie Mulgrew | 5(2) | 0 | 0 | 0 | 0 | 0 | 5(2) | 0 | 0 | 0 | |
| 28 | MF | (England) Rohan Ricketts ¤ | 15(4) | 0 | 3 | 0 | 1 | 0 | 19(4) | 0 | 2 | 0 | |
| 29 | MF | (Republic of Ireland) Kevin O'Connor | 3 | 0 | 0 | 0 | 0 | 0 | 3 | 0 | 0 | 0 | |
| 30 | GK | (Nigeria) Carl Ikeme | 0(1) | 0 | 0 | 0 | 1 | 0 | 1(1) | 0 | 0 | 0 | |
| 31 | GK | (Wales) Wayne Hennessey ¤ | 2 | 0 | 0 | 0 | 0 | 0 | 2 | 0 | 0 | 0 | |
| 32 | DF | (England) David Wheater ‡ | 1 | 0 | 0 | 0 | 0 | 0 | 1 | 0 | 0 | 0 | |
| 32 | MF | (Scotland) Michael McIndoe ‡ | 27(2) | 3 | 3 | 0 | 0 | 0 | 30(2) | 3 | 1 | 0 | |
| 33 | DF | (England) Martin Riley | 0 | 0 | 0 | 0 | 0 | 0 | 0 | 0 | 0 | 0 | |
| 34 | MF | (Republic of Ireland) Stephen Gleeson ¤ | 0(4) | 0 | 0 | 0 | 0 | 0 | 0(4) | 0 | 0 | 0 | |
| 35 | MF | (England) Elliott Bennett | 0 | 0 | 0 | 0 | 0 | 0 | 0 | 0 | 0 | 0 | |
| 36 | DF | (England) Lee Collins | 0 | 0 | 0 | 0 | 0 | 0 | 0 | 0 | 0 | 0 | |
| 37 | MF | (England) Chris Cornes † | 0 | 0 | 0 | 0 | 0 | 0 | 0 | 0 | 0 | 0 | (Note: Contract terminated having earlier tested positive for cocaine use.) |
| 37 | MF | (England) Michael Kightly ‡ | 26 | 8 | 0 | 0 | 0 | 0 | 26 | 8 | 4 | 0 | |
| 38 | DF | (England) Craig Fleming ‡ | 1 | 0 | 0 | 0 | 0 | 0 | 1 | 0 | 0 | 0 | |
| 39 | FW | (Republic of Ireland) Andy Keogh | 19 | 5 | 0 | 0 | 0 | 0 | 19 | 5 | 2 | 0 | |
| 40 | GK | (Denmark) Jan Budtz ‡ | 2(2) | 0 | 0 | 0 | 0 | 0 | 2(2) | 0 | 0 | 0 | |

=== Awards ===
| Award | Winner |
|---|---|
| Fans' Player of the Season | Matt Murray |
| Players' Player of the Season | Matt Murray |
| Young Player of the Season | Michael Kightly |
| Academy Player of the Season | Lee Collins |
| Goal of the Season | Jay Bothroyd (vs Leeds United, 10 September 2006) |

== Transfers ==
=== In ===
| Date | Player | From | Fee |
|---|---|---|---|
| 20 July 2006 | (Republic of Ireland) Gary Breen | Unattached | Free |
| 27 July 2006 | (England) Jay Bothroyd | Unattached | Free |
| 2 August 2006 | (England) Jamie Clapham | Unattached | Free |
| 3 August 2006 | (England) Karl Henry | Stoke City | £175,000 |
| 17 August 2006 | (United States) Jemal Johnson | Blackburn Rovers | Undisclosed |
| 24 August 2006 | (Scotland) Charlie Mulgrew | (Scotland) Celtic | Part exchange |
| 1 January 2007 | (Scotland) Michael McIndoe | Barnsley | £250,000 |
| 1 January 2007 | (England) Michael Kightly | Grays Athletic | £25,000 |
| 5 January 2007 | (Scotland) Neill Collins | Sunderland | £150,000 |
| 16 January 2007 | (Republic of Ireland) Stephen Ward | (Republic of Ireland) Bohemians | £100,000 |
| 18 January 2007 | (Republic of Ireland) Darren Potter | Liverpool | £250,000 |
| 23 January 2007 | (Republic of Ireland) Andy Keogh | Scunthorpe United | £600,000 |

=== Out ===
| Date | Player | To | Fee |
|---|---|---|---|
| June 2006 | (Scotland) Kenny Miller | (Scotland) Celtic | Free |
| June 2006 | (England) Darren Anderton | Released | Free |
| June 2006 | (Scotland) Colin Cameron | Released | Free |
| June 2006 | (Romania) Vio Ganea | Released | Free |
| June 2006 | (England) Paul Ince | Released | Free |
| June 2006 | (Netherlands) Stefan Postma | Released | Free |
| June 2006 | (Scotland) Maurice Ross | Released | Free |
| June 2006 | (Portugal) Silas | Released | Free |
| 14 June 2006 | (England) Joleon Lescott | Everton | £5 million |
| 11 July 2006 | (Republic of Ireland) Mark Kennedy | (England) Crystal Palace | Free |
| 11 July 2006 | (South Korea) Seol Ki-Hyeon | Reading | £1.5 million |
| 24 August 2006 | (England) Lee Naylor | (Scotland) Celtic | £600,000 |
| 28 September 2006 | (England) Chris Cornes | Released | Free |
| 15 January 2007 | (England) Leon Clarke | Sheffield Wednesday | Undisclosed |
| 9 February 2007 | (Northern Ireland) Mark Clyde | Retired | – |
| 20 April 2007 | (Hungary) Gábor Gyepes | Released | Free |

=== Loans in ===
| Date | Player | From | End date |
|---|---|---|---|
| 25 July 2006 | (Brazil) Guilherme Finkler | (Brazil) Juventude | 31 January 2007 |
| 4 August 2006 | (Wales) Craig Davies | (Italy) Verona | End of season |
| 17 August 2006 | (Republic of Ireland) Darren Potter | Liverpool | 18 January 2007 |
| 26 September 2006 | (England) David Wheater | Middlesbrough | 15 November 2006 |
| 2 November 2006 | (Scotland) Neill Collins | Sunderland | 2 January 2007 |
| 17 November 2006 | (England) Michael Kightly | Grays Athletic | 1 January 2007 |
| 23 November 2006 | (Scotland) Michael McIndoe | Barnsley | 1 January 2007 |
| 19 January 2007 | (England) Craig Fleming | Norwich City | 15 February 2007 |
| 25 January 2007 | (Denmark) Jan Budtz | Doncaster Rovers | 23 April 2007 |

=== Loans out ===
| Date | Player | To | End date |
|---|---|---|---|
| 31 July 2006 | (England) Keith Lowe | Brighton & Hove Albion | 28 August 2006 |
| 11 August 2006 | (Wales) Wayne Hennessey | Bristol City | 8 September 2006 |
| 26 August 2006 | (Poland) Tomasz Frankowski | (Spain) Tenerife | End of season |
| 8 September 2006 | (England) Keith Lowe | Cheltenham Town | 10 October 2006 |
| 26 October 2006 | (England) Keith Lowe | Cheltenham Town | 22 November 2006 |
| 3 November 2006 | (Republic of Ireland) Stephen Gleeson | Stockport County | 3 February 2007 |
| 4 January 2007 | (England) Keith Lowe | Cheltenham Town | End of season |
| 11 January 2007 | (Wales) Wayne Hennessey | Stockport County | 10 April 2007 |
| 19 February 2007 | (United States) Jemal Johnson | Leeds United | End of season |
| 9 March 2007 | (Hungary) Dénes Rósa | Cheltenham Town | 9 April 2007 |
| 22 March 2007 | (England) Rohan Ricketts | Queens Park Rangers | End of season |

== Kit ==
The season saw new home and away kits, both manufactured by Le Coq Sportif. The away kit was an all-white design. Chaucer Consulting sponsored the club for a third season.
