= Darcy Blake =

Welsh association football player (born 1988)

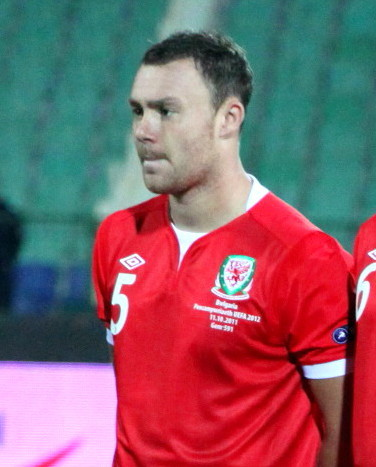
- Blake lining up for Wales in 2011

Personal information
- Full name: Darcy James Blake
- Date of birth: 13 December 1988 (age 37)
- Place of birth: New Tredegar, Wales
- Height: 5 ft 10 in (1.78 m)
- Positions: Defender; midfielder

Youth career
- 1999–2005: Cardiff City

Senior career*
Years	Team	Apps	(Gls)
2005–2012	Cardiff City	90	(0)
2009	→ Plymouth Argyle (loan)	7	(0)
2012–2014	Crystal Palace	10	(0)
2014	Newport County	8	(0)
2015	Aberbargoed Buds	8	(0)
Total		115	(0)

International career
2004–2005	Wales U17	5	(1)
2005–2006	Wales U19	6	(0)
2006–2009	Wales U21	14	(0)
2010–2012	Wales	14	(1)
- * Club domestic league appearances and goals

Darcy James Blake (born 13 December 1988) is a Welsh former professional footballer. During his career, he won 14 caps for Wales at international level, scoring once, and made more than 100 appearances in the Football League.

He began his career as a youth player with Cardiff City before making his professional debut at the age of 17 in 2006. During the 2009–10 season he spent time on loan with Plymouth Argyle. After returning to Cardiff, he struggled to establish himself in the first team but went on to make over 100 appearances for the club.

In 2012, he joined Crystal Palace for £350,000 but was released by the club after 18 months having made ten appearances. Blake received criticism from a number of former managers, including Dave Jones, Malky Mackay and Chris Coleman, during his career regarding his fitness levels. He later had a brief spell with Newport County before dropping out of the professional game at the age of 25, playing for local amateur teams and briefly converting to rugby.

== Early life ==
Born in New Tredegar, Blake grew up in Phillipstown. As a teenager, Blake attended Blackwood Comprehensive School and was childhood friends with boxer Nathan Cleverly.

== Club career ==
=== Cardiff City ===
Blake joined local youth side Jubilee Thistle at the age of nine where he played as a striker. At the age of 10, Blake joined the youth academy at Cardiff City, the club he supported alongside Liverpool, although he continued playing for Thistle until he was 12. After progressing through the club's youth system, he signed his first professional contract at the club in 2006 with a three-year deal, along with fellow academy graduate Chris Gunter. Blake made his professional debut on 17 April 2006 against Crewe Alexandra in the Football League Championship, following injuries to several first team players, replacing Jeff Whitley as a late substitute during a 1–1 draw. The following season, Blake was involved in the first team early, making two appearances in the opening month of the season but made just four further appearances during the first half of the season. On 20 February 2007, Blake made his first league start for the club in a match against West Bromwich Albion; Cardiff lost the match 1–0.

Able to play in several different positions, Blake gained a reputation as being a versatile player having played at centre back, right back, centre midfield and right wing for Cardiff in his first full season, commenting "I'm not sure where my best position is and I really don't mind where I play." Blake began the 2007–08 season in the reserve side but, after a number of injuries affecting the club, he was increasingly involved in first team matches, including coming on as a substitute for Kevin McNaughton during a 2–0 win over Middlesbrough in the FA Cup quarter-final which was followed by his first league start of the season at right back in a 1–1 draw with Colchester United. In total he made 13 appearances during the season, including featuring in three of the club's six matches as they reached the FA Cup final but was left out of the matchday squad for the match.

At the start of the 2008–09 season, Blake was placed on a special training regime by the club to correct his posture in an attempt to remedy long-term injury problems after being substituted in the opening 20 minutes of a League Cup tie against Milton Keynes Dons.

=== Plymouth Argyle ===
On 28 August 2009, Blake signed for fellow Championship club Plymouth Argyle on loan until January 2010, making his debut the following day in a 3–1 defeat to Sheffield Wednesday. In his fifth appearance for the side, he was sent off for the first time in his professional career during a 1–1 draw with Ipswich Town on 24 October 2009 following a foul on Jonathan Walters. Plymouth appealed the decision but the red card was upheld and he was subsequently suspended for three matches. Blake completed his loan at Plymouth on 31 December 2009 and returned to Cardiff. However, Plymouth manager Paul Mariner stated his desire for Blake to return to the club during the January transfer window. However, the club was placed under a transfer embargo that delayed the move and Blake was able to force his way into the first team at Cardiff again.

Blake has cited his loan spell with Plymouth as a turning point in his career, stating "Looking back, I was immature and needed that loan move away." Prior to his move, Cardiff manager Jones had been critical of Blake's diet and subsequent fitness levels.

=== Return to Cardiff ===
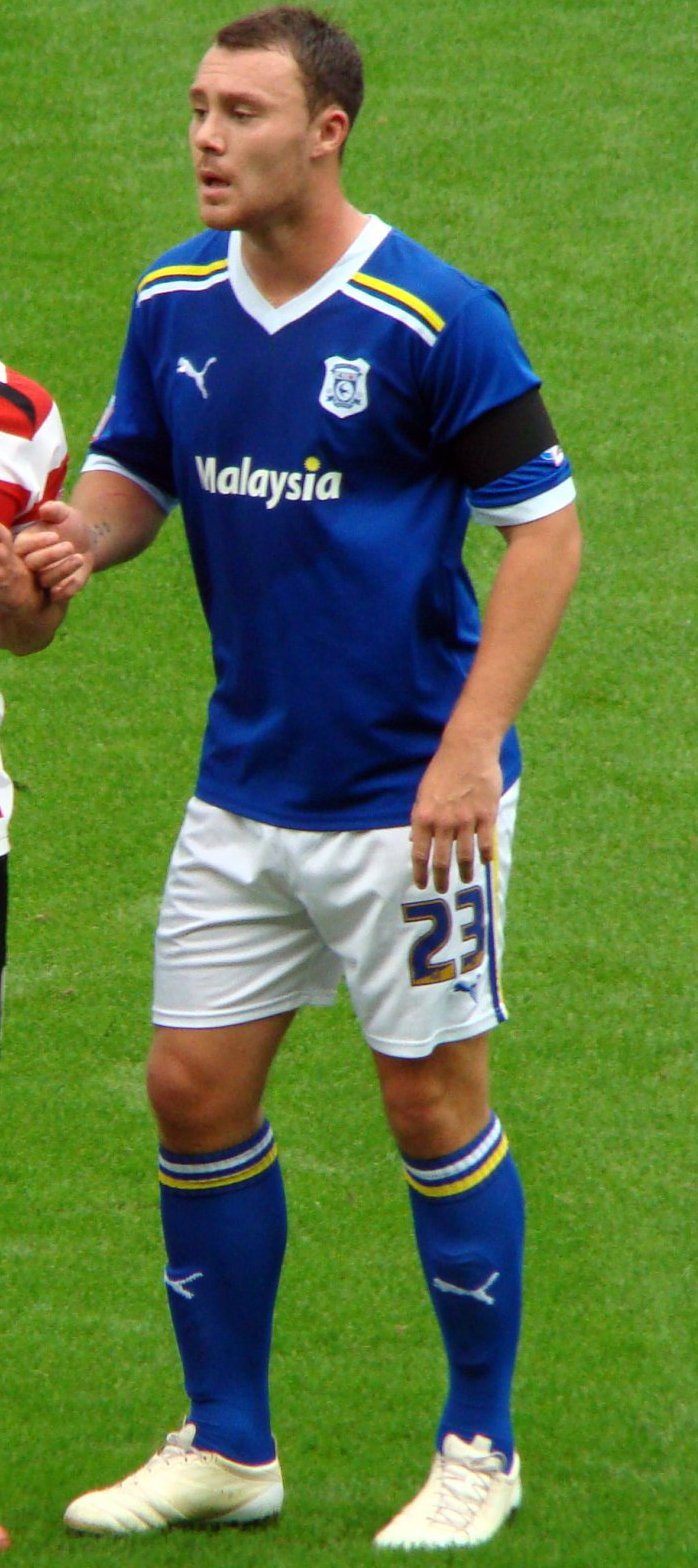
Blake playing for Cardiff City in 2011

On his return to Cardiff, Blake was immediately involved with the first team where he was named on the bench in an FA Cup third round replay against Bristol City, where he came on to make his first appearance of the season, before making his first start of the season in the fourth round against Leicester City four days later. Injuries to club captain Mark Hudson and Gabor Gyepes allowed Blake to establish himself in the side as a centre-back alongside Anthony Gerrard. He made a career-high 24 appearances and helped the team reach the Championship play-offs before losing 3–2 to Blackpool in the play-off final.

Blake missed Cardiff's 2011–12 pre-season schedule through injury but returned in a 1–1 draw with Burnley on 20 August 2011, coming on as a substitute in place of Joe Mason. He made his 100th appearance for Cardiff against Portsmouth on 27 August, which was also his first league start of the season. Despite being a regular at international level for Wales, Blake struggled to establish himself in the first team at Cardiff, former Wales striker Iwan Roberts to question his future at Cardiff City Stadium. Cardiff manager, Malky Mackay, replied to this saying Blake was "in his plans" but his injuries and fitness were a problem. The newly formed partnership of Mark Hudson and Ben Turner were preferred ahead of Blake, who later confirmed his desire to hold talks with boss Mackay over his future at Cardiff having not featured for the club in over a month. At the end of the season, he played in the 2012 Football League Cup Final, replacing McNaughton in extra time as Cardiff went on to lose to Liverpool in a penalty shootout. On 9 August 2012, Blake rejected new terms at Cardiff, where he only had a year left on his contract following his time as a bit part player the previous season. On 22 August, Blake entered talks with Crystal Palace over a possible move.

=== Crystal Palace ===
With his contract due to expire at the end of the season, Mackay accepted an offer of £350,000 from Crystal Palace in order to avoid Blake leaving on a free transfer the following summer, with the deal being completed on 24 August 2012. Although Blake was reluctant to leave Cardiff, he accepted the move in order to play first team football, stating "My dream has always been to play for the Bluebirds at Premier League level [...] I thought hard about everything before leaving City. But it was time to make a decision."

He made his debut for Palace on 25 August 2012 in a 2–1 defeat to Middlesbrough. After initially featuring in the first team, he was dropped from the side and did not make an appearance for Palace after December 2012. Wales manager Chris Coleman publicly criticised Blake's fitness levels after revealing that he had been deemed too unfit for Palace's reserve side and stated "Darcy has got to be fitter. He has lost his fitness and there is no easy way around it."

He remained with Palace following the club's promotion to the Premier League but made no further appearances and, on 31 January 2014, his contract was terminated by mutual consent after making only 10 league appearances.

=== Newport County ===
On 20 March 2014, Blake joined Newport County on non-contract terms, having spent time training with Birmingham City. His signing was branded a "transfer coup" by County manager Justin Edinburgh and he made his debut for Newport in a League Two match against Torquay United on 22 March. He remained at Newport until the end of the 2013–14 season, making seven appearances. Although he held talks with the club regarding an extension, he was unable to agree a new contract with Edinburgh commenting "I don't think that we could make the offer they were looking for."

Blake went on to train with Plymouth in July 2014, the club he was loaned to in 2009, but left on 28 August 2014 after failing to earn a permanent deal. The following month, he played for local amateur side Tredegar Arms in the North Gwent Football League after the club were short of players due to injuries, scoring a hat-trick while playing as a striker against Pantside. Pantside appealed to the league officials over his inclusion in the match but no action was taken after the league confirmed he was registered to play for the side. He returned to Newport briefly on trial but was not offered a contract although Edinburgh commented "It would be an absolute waste if the boy didn't get back into the pro game." He also played for amateur rugby team New Tredegar's seconds side in Division Two of the Gwent, Newport and Pontypool District League and appeared on an episode of the BBC Wales rugby show Scrum V with some of his teammates. In October 2015, he returned to football after being appointed as a player-coach for Aberbargoed Buds.

== International career ==
Blake was a regular for the Wales under-17 and under-19 squads before he was called up to the under-21 team for the first time in 2006 by coach Brian Flynn and made his debut for the side against Israel. Usually playing at right back, he was part of the team that finished top of their qualifying group for the 2009 UEFA European Under-21 Football Championship before losing in the playoff match against England.

In May 2008, he received his first call-up, alongside six other uncapped members of the Wales under-21 side, to the Wales team. Blake made his full international debut on 12 October 2010, being named in the starting line-up for a 4–1 defeat to Switzerland in Basel before being replaced by Christian Ribeiro after 54 minutes. He played his second game against Scotland, in the Nations Cup, where Wales lost 3–1. On 10 August 2011, Blake scored his first senior career goal in a 2–1 defeat against Australia and was named in the starting line-up in the side's following match against Montenegro due to James Collins being suspended. Despite being largely a reserve player for Cardiff at the time, he established himself in the side as a centre back under manager Gary Speed, who described Blake as a player that could "shine in the Premier League," and kept his place in the side for the remainder of the Euro 2012 qualifiers, including a 1–0 defeat against England where he received praise for his performance.

== Career statistics ==
=== Club ===
Appearances and goals by club, season and competition
Club	Season	League			National Cup		League Cup		Other		Total	
Club	Season	Division	Apps	Goals	Apps	Goals	Apps	Goals	Apps	Goals	Apps	Goals
Cardiff City	2005–06	Championship	1	0	0	0	0	0	—		1	0
Cardiff City	2006–07	Championship	10	0	0	0	1	0	2	0	13	0
Cardiff City	2007–08	Championship	8	0	3	0	1	0	1	0	13	0
Cardiff City	2008–09	Championship	7	0	1	0	1	0	—		9	0
Cardiff City	2009–10	Championship	18	0	3	0	0	0	3	0	24	0
Cardiff City	2010–11	Championship	26	0	2	0	0	0	2	0	30	0
Cardiff City	2011–12	Championship	20	0	1	0	5	0	2	0	28	0
Cardiff City	Total		90	0	10	0	8	0	10	0	118	0
Plymouth Argyle (loan)	2009–10	Championship	7	0	0	0	0	0	—		7	0
Crystal Palace	2012–13	Championship	10	0	0	0	1	0	0	0	11	0
Crystal Palace	2013–14	Premier League	0	0	0	0	0	0	0	0	0	0
Crystal Palace	Total		10	0	0	0	1	0	0	0	11	0
Newport County	2013–14	League Two	8	0	0	0	0	0	0	0	8	0
Career total			115	0	10	0	9	0	10	0	144	0

=== International goals ===
Scores and results list. Wales's goal tally first.

Goal	Date	Venue	Opponent	Score	Result	Competition
1	10 August 2011	Cardiff City Stadium, Cardiff, Wales	Australia	1–2	1–2	Friendly

== Honours ==
Cardiff City

- Football League Cup runner-up: 2011–12
