= Martin John =

English footballer

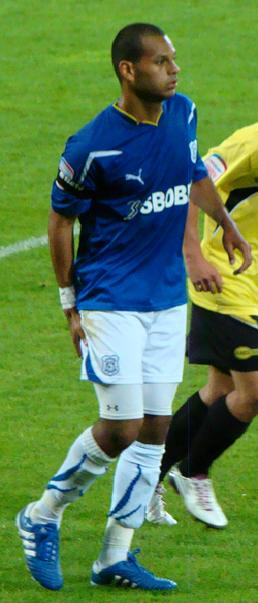

Personal information
- Date of birth: 1 August 1988 (age 38)
- Place of birth: Camden, London, England
- Position: Defender

College career
Years	Team	Apps	(Gls)
2005–2006	Maine Black Bears		
2007–2008	Buffalo Bulls		

Senior career*
Years	Team	Apps	(Gls)
2008	Ottawa Fury	12	(2)
2009–2010	Argentinos Juniors	0	(0)
2010–2011	Cardiff City	0	(0)
2010	→ Newport County (loan)	9	(0)
2012–2013	Ontinyent	24	(0)
- * Club domestic league appearances and goals as of 2 March 2013

Martin John (born 1 August 1988) is a former professional footballer who plays as a defender. He has played for Argentinos Juniors, Cardiff City, and Ontinyent.

== Early life ==
Born in London, England, John has two brothers and one sister. At the age of 5 he moved to Italy where he lived for three years before moving to Canada. He grew up in Ottawa and attended Lisgar Collegiate Institute.

His mother is Swiss-Colombian and his father is Gambian.

== Career ==
=== Youth and college ===
John played for the Maine Black Bears from the University of Maine in Orono, Maine, United States, after joining the team in 2005, before moving to the University at Buffalo, making 34 appearances for the university team Buffalo Bulls between 2007 and 2008.

=== Cardiff City ===
After spending time playing for the reserve side of Argentinos Juniors, he appeared in a pre-season match for Welling United during a 4–1 win over Arsenal Reserves on 24 July 2010. During the match, he was spotted by Cardiff City F.C. and was invited to join the club on trial in July 2010, eventually signing on a permanent basis. He made his debut on 11 August 2010 in a 4–1 win over Burton Albion in the first round of the Football League Cup.

On 9 September 2010, John joined Newport County on a three-month loan deal, making his debut in a 1–0 win over Rushden & Diamonds.

In August 2011 John went on trial for Maccabi Netanya from the Israeli Premier League. He played one game for the club in a Toto Cup fixture.

In 2012, John signed for Spanish Segunda B side Ontinyent CF.

John went on trial with Plymouth Argyle in July 2013.
