= Gábor Gyepes =

Hungarian footballer

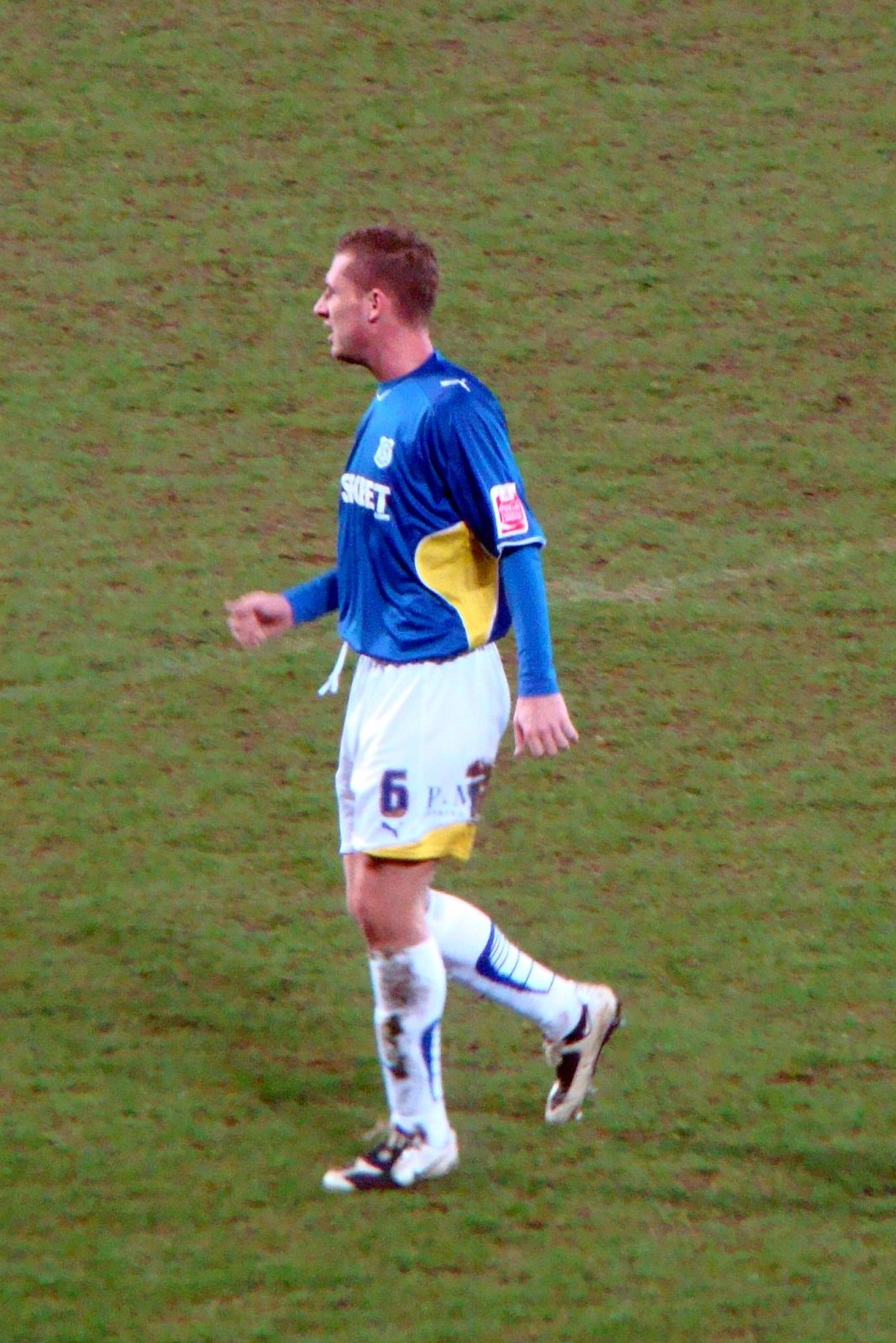
- Gyepes playing for Cardiff City in 2010

Personal information
- Full name: Gábor Gyepes
- Date of birth: 26 June 1981 (age 45)
- Place of birth: Budapest, Hungary
- Height: 6 ft 3 in (1.91 m)
- Position: Centre back

Youth career
- 1998: Ferencváros

Senior career*
Years	Team	Apps	(Gls)
1999–2005	Ferencváros	112	(12)
2005–2007	Wolverhampton Wanderers	20	(0)
2008	Northampton Town	15	(0)
2008–2012	Cardiff City	64	(4)
2012	Vasas	14	(0)
2012–2013	Portsmouth	35	(4)
2013	Videoton	12	(0)
2014	Sarawak FA	14	(2)
2015–2018	Soroksár	76	(19)
2018–2019	III. Kerület	22	(3)
2019–2021	Biatorbágy		
2021	Budakalász		
Total		384	(40)

International career
2002–2009	Hungary	26	(1)
- * Club domestic league appearances and goals

Gábor Gyepes (Hungarian pronunciation: [ˈɡaːbor ˈɟɛpɛʃ]; born 26 June 1981) is a Hungarian former professional footballer.

Gyepes began his career with Ferencváros, where he won two Hungarian national championships. He went on to make over 100 appearances in the English Football League with Wolverhampton Wanderers, Northampton Town, Cardiff City, and Portsmouth.

He was capped 26 times for the Hungary national football team between 2002 and 2009, scoring once in his first full appearance for the team, a friendly match with Switzerland.

== Club career ==
=== Ferencváros ===
Gyepes was born in Budapest. He began his career at Ferencváros in his home country. As a youngster in the club's youth system he played in all outfield positions, including scoring 20 times in his last 16 games during his final year in the youth side. He made his first team debut in 1999 and went on to establish himself in the side over the following years, including playing in the Champions League qualifiers and then the UEFA Cup.

=== Wolverhampton Wanderers ===
In July 2005, Gyepes joined Football League Championship side Wolverhampton Wanderers initially on loan from Ferencváros after impressing during a trial week. He made his debut for the club on 23 August 2005 in a 5–1 League Cup rout of Chester City.

He became a regular fixture at centre back during the season, partnering Joleon Lescott, and his move was made permanent when he signed a two-and-a-half-year contract in December 2005 for £400,000. This deal later led to an FA charge against Gyepes' agent for improper practice. However, he ruptured cruciate knee ligaments on 25 March 2006, during a 3–1 defeat against Sheffield Wednesday and underwent surgery to repair the injury and was told that he would never play football again. This injury ruled him out of the whole of the following season, despite making a reserve appearance in February 2007. After suffering a further setback, it was reported that his contract with Wolves had been terminated by mutual consent in April 2007 so Gyepes could continue his rehabilitation in Hungary.

=== Northampton Town ===
After regaining full fitness, the defender returned to England and won a contract at Northampton Town in January 2008 that ran until the end of the season, having previously worked with manager Stuart Gray at Wolves. Gyepes also spent time on trial at Queens Park Rangers as his agent also represented their Hungarian international Ákos Buzsáky. He made his debut for the side on 12 February 2008 in a 1–0 defeat to Yeovil Town and, after establishing himself in the first team, he signed a new contract in April 2008 to keep him at the club until the end of the 2008–09 season. The contract included a release clause allowing him to discuss a transfer to any club offering a particular fee to Northampton Town.

=== Cardiff City ===
On 19 August 2008, Gyepes completed a move to Football League Championship side Cardiff City, as a replacement for Glenn Loovens who had completed a move to Celtic several days before, after they offered the required amount to trigger the clause, thought to be in the region of £200,000. He made his debut for the club on 25 October when he came on as a substitute to replace captain Darren Purse during a 1–0 win over Nottingham Forest. After a poor defensive performance during a 2–1 defeat to Plymouth Argyle in November manager Dave Jones made several changes to the side, including handing Gyepes his first start in place of club captain Darren Purse in a 2–2 draw with Reading. After settling in the first team, including being named in the Championship team of the week for the first week of December, Gyepes scored his first goal for the Bluebirds with the second goal in the 2–1 win over Ipswich Town. After making over 21 appearances during the season, he signed a new three-year deal at Cardiff after activating a clause in his contract.

The start of the 2009–10 season saw Gyepes relegated to the bench behind new signings Mark Hudson and Anthony Gerrard, his only appearances in the opening three months of the season coming in the Football League Cup. He made his first league appearance of the season on 21 November 2009 in a 1–0 defeat against Barnsley, in place of the injured Anthony Gerrard. After a long spell in the team he scored his 3rd goal for the Bluebirds as he aims to stay in the team until the end of the season.

During the 2010–11 season, Gyepes started in the defense after giving Anthony Gerrard to Hull City on loan but however was dropped for January signing Dekel Keinan, then in March, Hudson suffered an injury keeping him out for the majority of the remainder of the season, but Kevin McNaughton was chosen to partner Keinan in the heart of the defense. On 22 May, Gyepes said he would never play under Dave Jones again.

However, Jones was sacked at the end of the season and Malky Mackay took his place, but Gyepes still didn't find himself in the team for the first game but started the next game against Oxford United. Gyepes got his first goal of the season in a 5–3 victory over Huddersfield Town in the following round of the League Cup. On 31 January 2012, Cardiff and Gyepes mutually agreed to terminate his contract to pursue his career elsewhere.

=== Vasas SC ===
On 15 March 2012, Preston North End manager Graham Westley confirmed that Gyepes had been on trial with the League One club that week. The following week he linked up with Championship team Portsmouth on trial.

After these trials, Gypes went on to finish off the 2011–12 season with Vasas SC in Hungary. He recently reiterated his desire to return to English football for the 2012–2013 season.

=== Portsmouth ===
On 7 September it was confirmed that he had signed for Portsmouth on a one-month deal, subject to international clearance. He made his debut in Portsmouth's 3–0 away win at Crawley Town. The Hungarian was substituted in the first half, for Adam Webster, having picked up an ankle injury. His next game came against Swindon Town in a 2–1 home loss, in which Gyepes played the full 90 minutes. Gyepes scored his first goal for Portsmouth against Scunthorpe United at Fratton Park. The ball was blasted in to the roof of the net, cancelling out Scunthorpe's goal sic minutes earlier, after the Hungarian was quickest to react to an air shot from Izale McLeod. The match ended with Portsmouth winning their first home league game of the 2012–13 season. This goal was the first for Gyepes in over a year and a half. He followed it with goals in the next two matches; In a victory over Yeovil Town and in a draw with Milton Keynes Dons. Gyepes signed a new one-month deal on 8 January 2013, although after the end of the 2012–13 season, he rejected a new deal at Portsmouth and returned to Hungary as a free agent.

=== Sarawak FA ===
On 4 December 2013, Gyepes signed a one-year deal with Malaysia side Sarawak FA, on a free transfer. He made his debut for Sarawak on 18 January 2014 against ATM FA, however Sarawak losing 2–0 to ATM in the first game of Malaysia Super League. Gyepes scored his first Sarawak goal against Penang FA at the Sarawak State Stadium on 21 January 2014 by scoring the winning goal in the 100th minute after he dribbled past few players before attempting to shoot and the ball was deflected before heading into an empty net. Sarawak held on to secure a pivotal victory, booking their spot in the next round of the FA Cup.

Due to injuries, Gyepes was released by Sarawak at the end of 2014.

== International career ==
Gyepes made his debut for Hungary in 2002 and played 22 times in the following three years. However his knee injury sustained while playing for Wolves meant he fell out of favour. In March 2009, his form playing for Cardiff saw him receive his first call up in three years for the 2010 World Cup qualifiers against Albania and Malta.

=== International goals ===
#	Date	Venue	Opponent	Score	Result	Competition
1.	13 February 2002	Limassol, Cyprus	Switzerland	1–2	1–2	Friendly

== Career statistics ==
Appearances and goals by club, season and competition
Club	Season	League			National cup		League cup		Other		Total	
Club	Season	Division	Apps	Goals	Apps	Goals	Apps	Goals	Apps	Goals	Apps	Goals
Wolverhampton Wanderers	2005–06	Championship	20	0	2	0	2	0	0	0	24	0
Wolverhampton Wanderers	2006–07	Championship	0	0	0	0	0	0	0	0	0	0
Wolverhampton Wanderers	Total		20	0	2	0	2	0	0	0	24	0
Northampton Town	2007–08	League One	13	0	0	0	0	0	0	0	13	0
Northampton Town	2008–09	League One	2	0	0	0	1	0	0	0	3	0
Northampton Town	Total		15	0	0	0	1	0	0	0	16	0
Cardiff City	2008–09	Championship	27	2	2	0	0	0	0	0	29	2
Cardiff City	2009–10	Championship	16	1	2	0	2	0	0	0	20	1
Cardiff City	2010–11	Championship	21	1	1	0	1	0	0	0	23	1
Cardiff City	2011–12	Championship	0	0	0	0	2	1	0	0	2	1
Cardiff City	Total		64	4	5	0	5	1	0	0	74	5
Vasas	2011–12	Nemzeti Bajnokság I	4	0	0	0	0	0	0	0	4	0
Portsmouth	2012–13	League One	35	4	1	0	0	0	1	0	37	4
Career total			141	9	8	0	9	2	1	0	159	11

== Personal life ==
Gyepes and his wife, figure skater Diána Póth, married on 12 July 2008.

== Honours ==
Ferencváros

- Hungarian National Championship I: 2001, 2004
- Hungarian Cup: 2003, 2004
- Hungarian Super Cup: 2004
