= Adam Matthews =

Welsh footballer

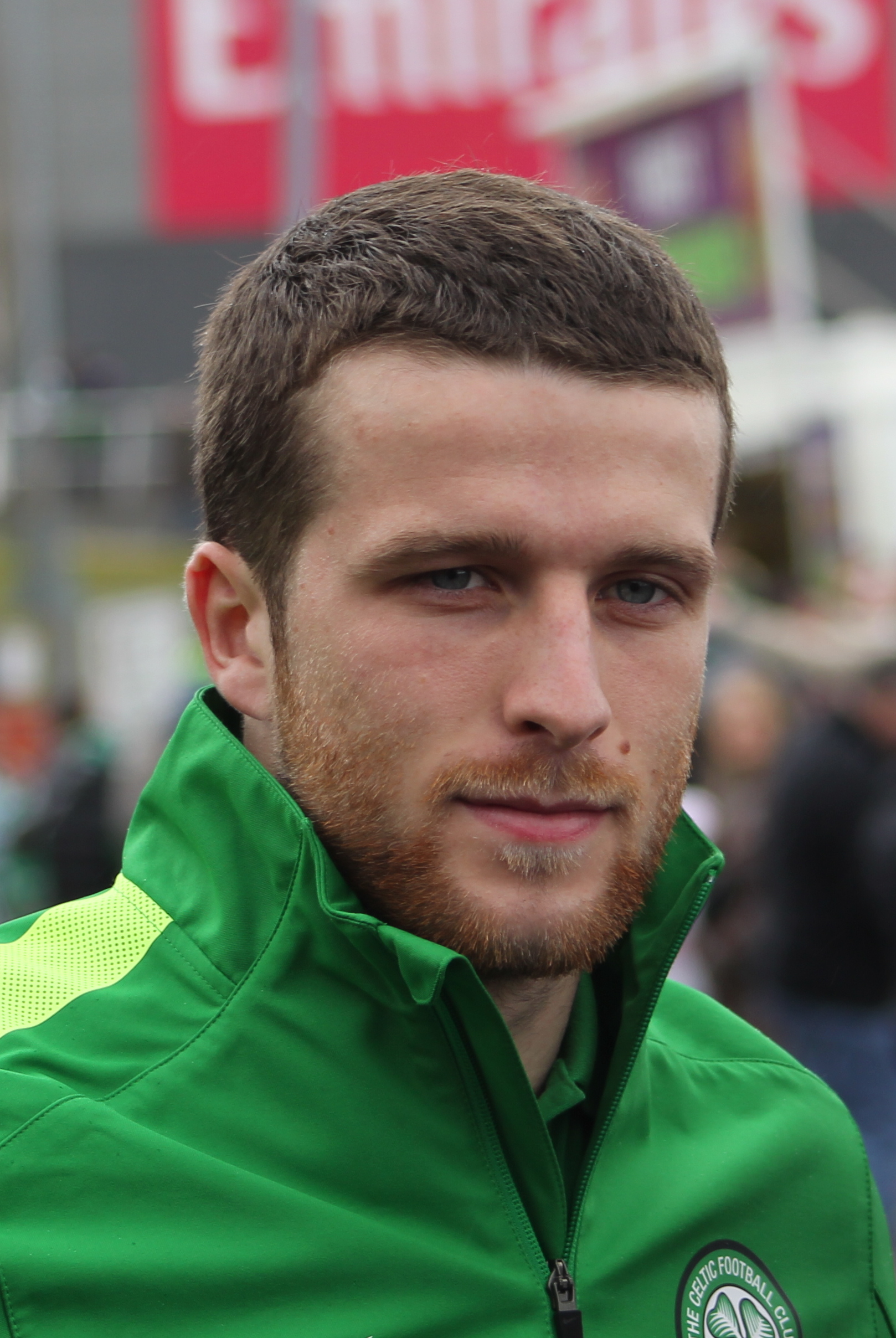
- Matthews in 2013

Personal information
- Full name: Adam James Matthews
- Date of birth: 13 January 1992 (age 34)
- Place of birth: Swansea, Wales
- Height: 5 ft 10 in (1.78 m)
- Positions: Right back; centre back

Team information
- Current team: Shamrock Rovers
- Number: 2

Youth career
- 2000–2009: Cardiff City

Senior career*
Years	Team	Apps	(Gls)
2009–2011	Cardiff City	40	(1)
2011–2015	Celtic	101	(4)
2015–2019	Sunderland	58	(2)
2016–2017	→ Bristol City (loan)	21	(0)
2019–2022	Charlton Athletic	84	(0)
2022–2024	Omonia	53	(1)
2025–	Shamrock Rovers	29	(1)

International career^{‡}
2008–2009	Wales U17	9	(0)
2008–2011	Wales U19	5	(1)
2009–2013	Wales U21	6	(0)
2011–2018	Wales	14	(0)
- * Club domestic league appearances and goals as of 16:52, 9 November 2026 (UTC) ‡ National team caps and goals as of 11:18, 15 May 2024 (UTC)

Adam James Matthews (born 13 January 1992) is a Welsh footballer who plays as a right back for Shamrock Rovers. He is a former Wales international.

== Early life ==
As a child, Matthews attended Penyrheol Comprehensive School in Swansea and before choosing football, was also a talented rugby player including being followed by the Ospreys rugby union side. Matthews' cousins, Liam and Sam, were both previously members of the academy at Cardiff City.

== Club career ==
=== Early career ===
After playing local football, Matthews was taken on trial at Swansea City but suffered a broken arm and was told to come back when he had recovered from the injury. After returning to fitness Matthews attempted to return to Swansea but was told that their youth system was now full.

=== Cardiff City ===
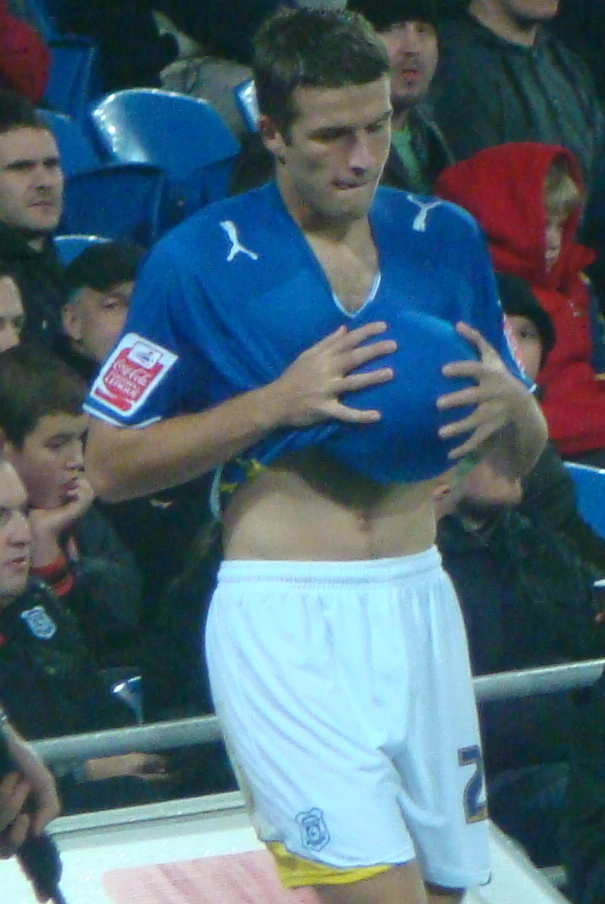
Matthews playing for Cardiff in 2009

Matthews attended a trial at Swansea's South Wales rivals Cardiff City and as the only player of around forty attendants at the trial chosen, signed on academy terms at the age of eight. After making his way through the youth side, signed a professional contract in January 2009. On 21 April 2009 Matthews featured in the full side for the first time, when he was named as a substitute in a 2–2 draw with Charlton Athletic.

He went on to make his professional debut at the start of the 2009–10 season when he replaced Paul Quinn during a 1–1 draw with Blackpool on 15 August. Due to injuries in the squad, Matthews was handed consecutive starts in a 3–1 win over Plymouth Argyle followed by a 3–0 win over Bristol City, forcing an own goal from Bristol City captain Jamie McCombe. His performances earned him a regular starting spot in the side, missing two matches in the following two months, including scoring his first senior goal during a 4–0 win over Watford on 3 October 2009 when goalkeeper Scott Loach misjudged Matthews' 50-yard free-kick, allowing the ball to bounce into the net. Prior to the January 2010 transfer window, Matthews was linked with moves to a number of Premier League clubs, including reports of an already completed deal with Premier League champions Manchester United, however Cardiff manager Dave Jones dismissed the rumours stating that no offers had been made. His performances during his debut season also saw him named as the Football League Apprentice of the Year for the Championship with Cardiff academy assistant manager Geraint Twose describing him as "a shining example to every young player on how to perform on the pitch, and also how to behave off the pitch."

=== Celtic ===
On 25 February 2011, Celtic announced they had secured the signing of Matthews on a pre-contract agreement to commence on 1 July, on a four-year contract. The move saw him link up with his former Cardiff teammate Joe Ledley. Matthews was given the number two shirt that was previously worn by Andreas Hinkel.

Matthews made an impressive debut in a 1–0 win over Aberdeen on 7 August. He then played in his first European match, after coming on as a substitute in Celtic's 2–0 loss to Atlético Madrid. On 29 September he played in Celtic's 1–1 Europa League draw with Udinese, he started the match at right back but moved to left back for the second half when fellow countryman Joe Ledley went off injured. After an impressive start to the season, it was reported that Premier League clubs Fulham and Everton were interested in signing Matthews in the January transfer window. He made his Champions League debut at Celtic Park against HJK Helsinki on 1 August 2012.

Matthews was part of the Celtic side which famously beat Barcelona 2–1 in the UEFA Champions League on 8 November 2012. He scored his first-ever goal for the club on 12 December, a powerful strike into the far corner of the goal against Arbroath in the Scottish Cup replay.

=== Sunderland ===
On 3 July 2015, Matthews signed for Sunderland on a four-year contract, moving for a fee of £2 million. His debut came on the opening day of the season, in a 4–2 loss to Leicester City. Matthews later suffered an ankle injury which kept him out for six weeks and struggled to regain a place in the first team.

==== Loan to Bristol City ====
After only two appearances for Sunderland, he joined Championship club Bristol City on loan for the remainder of the season, on 7 March 2016. He made his debut in Bristol City's 6–0 win over bottom club, Bolton Wanderers on 19 March. Matthews helped City to safety during his nine appearances.

New Sunderland manager, David Moyes, deemed Matthews surplus to requirements at the Stadium of Light and he rejoined Bristol City on a season-long loan on 28 July 2016. He suffered a hamstring tear in August, which ruled him out for 4 weeks.

=== Charlton Athletic ===
Matthews signed a one-year deal with Charlton Athletic having been training with the club for a number of weeks after leaving Sunderland at the end of his contract.

On 26 October 2020, Matthews signed a new one-year deal with Charlton Athletic.

On 8 July 2021, Matthews signed a new deal with the club, keeping at Charlton Athletic for the 2021–22 season.

On 10 May 2022, it was confirmed that Matthews would leave Charlton Athletic when his contract expired.

=== Omonia ===
On 23 June 2022, Matthews signed a two-year contract with Omonia, joining his former manager at Celtic, Neil Lennon.

=== Shamrock Rovers ===
He joined League of Ireland Premier Division club Shamrock Rovers on 28 January 2025, signing on a free transfer. Rovers' sporting director Stephen McPhail had been Matthews' teammate at Cardiff City, which played a part in Rovers manager Stephen Bradley's decision to sign him. "[Matthews] will bring really valuable experience and his ability on the pitch speaks for itself," Bradley said, "He's one we think can help the group go to another level." He made his debut for the club on 16 February 2025 in the first league game of the season, a Dublin Derby against Bohemians at the Aviva Stadium, but was substituted off injured in the 28th minute after colliding with his own goalkeeper Edward McGinty in the process of conceding the only goal of the game, with the recovery period ultimately keeping him out of action for two months. Matthews scored his first for the hoops in their last league game of the season with a goal from long range against Sligo Rovers.

== International career ==
Matthews made his début for the Wales under-17 side on 28 February 2008 in a 1–0 win over Austria and played in two out of the team's three matches during the 2008 UEFA Under-17 Championship elite round. On 15 September 2008, he captained the side for the first time during a 4–1 win over Faroe Islands, the first match during the qualifying round of the 2009 UEFA Under-17 Championship, remaining as captain throughout the remaining matches of the qualifying round. His final appearance for the under-17 side came on 28 March 2009 in a 3–0 defeat against Finland.

In July 2008, he was part of the under-19 side that took part in the Milk Cup, featuring in games against Chile and Israel. His next participation at youth level for Wales came when he was called up to the under-21 side for matches against Hungary and Italy, but remained on the bench in both games. On 9 November 2009, Matthews was called up to the Wales senior squad for the first time in his career for a friendly against Scotland at the age of seventeen, but remained on the bench. Four days later, Matthews made his début for the under-21 side when he played 45 minutes in a 2–1 defeat to Bosnia and Herzegovina before being substituted due to a foot injury.

Matthews made his senior Wales début on 25 May 2011, against Scotland, in the Nations Cup, he came on as 61st-minute substitute for Neal Eardley. After playing in some friendlies, Matthews took part in his first qualifying game for a major tournament on 11 October 2011 when he came on as a substitute in a Euro 2012 qualifying tie away against Bulgaria. It was his long pass that set up Gareth Bale to score the only goal in a 1–0 victory.

On 22 December 2011 it was revealed that Matthews had been invited to participate in the Great Britain team for the 2012 Summer Olympics. However, he was not subsequently selected for the GB squad.

Matthews was not called up for the national team during the 2014–15 season despite being a regular starter at Celtic. He started in the friendly against Northern Ireland in March 2016, having won his last cap three years earlier. He was not selected for the final Euro 2016 squad. Matthews didn't play again for Wales until March 2018, when he came on as a substitute in Wales' 1–0 loss against Uruguay in the final of the 2018 China Cup.

== Career statistics ==
As of match played on 30 August 2026

Appearances and goals by club, season and competition
Club	Season	League			National cup		League cup		Europe		Other		Total	
Club	Season	Division	Apps	Goals	Apps	Goals	Apps	Goals	Apps	Goals	Apps	Goals	Apps	Goals
Cardiff City	2009–10	Championship	32	1	2	0	1	0	–		–		35	1
Cardiff City	2010–11	Championship	8	0	2	0	2	0	–		1 (Note: Appearance in Championship play-offs)	0	13	0
Cardiff City	Total		40	1	4	0	3	0	0	0	1	0	48	1
Celtic	2011–12	Scottish Premier League	27	0	2	0	4	0	5 (Note: Appearances in UEFA Europa League)	0	–		38	0
Celtic	2012–13	Scottish Premier League	22	2	4	1	3	0	10 (Note: Appearances in UEFA Champions League)	0	–		39	3
Celtic	2013–14	Scottish Premier League	23	1	1	0	1	0	6	0	–		31	1
Celtic	2014–15	Scottish Premier League	29	1	3	0	1	0	9 (Note: Four appearances in UEFA Champions League; five appearances in UEFA Europa League)	0	–		42	1
Celtic	Total		101	4	10	1	9	0	30	0	0	0	150	5
Sunderland	2015–16	Premier League	1	0	0	0	1	0	–		–		2	0
Sunderland	2016–17	Premier League	0	0	0	0	0	0	–		–		0	0
Sunderland	2017–18	Championship	34	1	0	0	3	0	–		–		37	1
Sunderland	2018–19	League One	23	1	2	0	0	0	–		3 (Note: Appearance(s) in EFL Trophy)	0	28	1
Sunderland	Total		58	2	2	0	4	0	0	0	3	0	67	2
Bristol City (loan)	2015–16	Championship	9	0	0	0	0	0	–		–		9	0
Bristol City (loan)	2016–17	Championship	12	0	0	0	2	0	–		–		14	0
Bristol City (loan)	Total		21	0	0	0	2	0	0	0	0	0	23	0
Charlton Athletic	2019–20	Championship	29	0	0	0	0	0	–		–		29	0
Charlton Athletic	2020–21	League One	27	0	1	0	0	0	–		1	0	29	0
Charlton Athletic	2021–22	League One	28	0	0	0	0	0	–		3	0	31	0
Charlton Athletic	Total		84	0	1	0	0	0	0	0	4	0	89	0
Omonia	2022–23	Cypriot First Division	23	0	6	0	–		7	0	1 (Note: Appearance in Cyprus Super Cup)	0	37	0
Omonia	2023–24	Cypriot First Division	30	1	3	0	–		4 (Note: Appearances in UEFA Conference League)	0	1	0	38	1
Omonia	Total		53	1	9	0	0	0	11	0	2	0	75	1
Shamrock Rovers	2025	LOI Premier Division	18	1	2	0	–		4	0	0 (Note: Appearances in Leinster Senior Cup)	0	24	1
Shamrock Rovers	2026	LOI Premier Division	11	0	0	0	–		0	0	2 (Note: One appearance in President of Ireland's Cup; one appearance in Leinster Senior Cup)	0	13	0
Shamrock Rovers	Total		29	1	2	0	0	0	4	0	2	0	37	1
Career total			386	9	28	1	15	0	45	0	12	0	486	10

== Honours ==
Celtic

- Scottish Premiership: 2011–12, 2012–13, 2013–14, 2014–15
- Scottish Cup: 2012–13
- Scottish League Cup: 2014–15

Omonia

- Cypriot Cup: 2022–23

Shamrock Rovers

- League of Ireland Premier Division: 2025, 2026
- FAI Cup: 2025

Individual

- Championship Apprentice of the Year: 2009–10
