= Peter Whittingham =

English footballer (1984–2020)

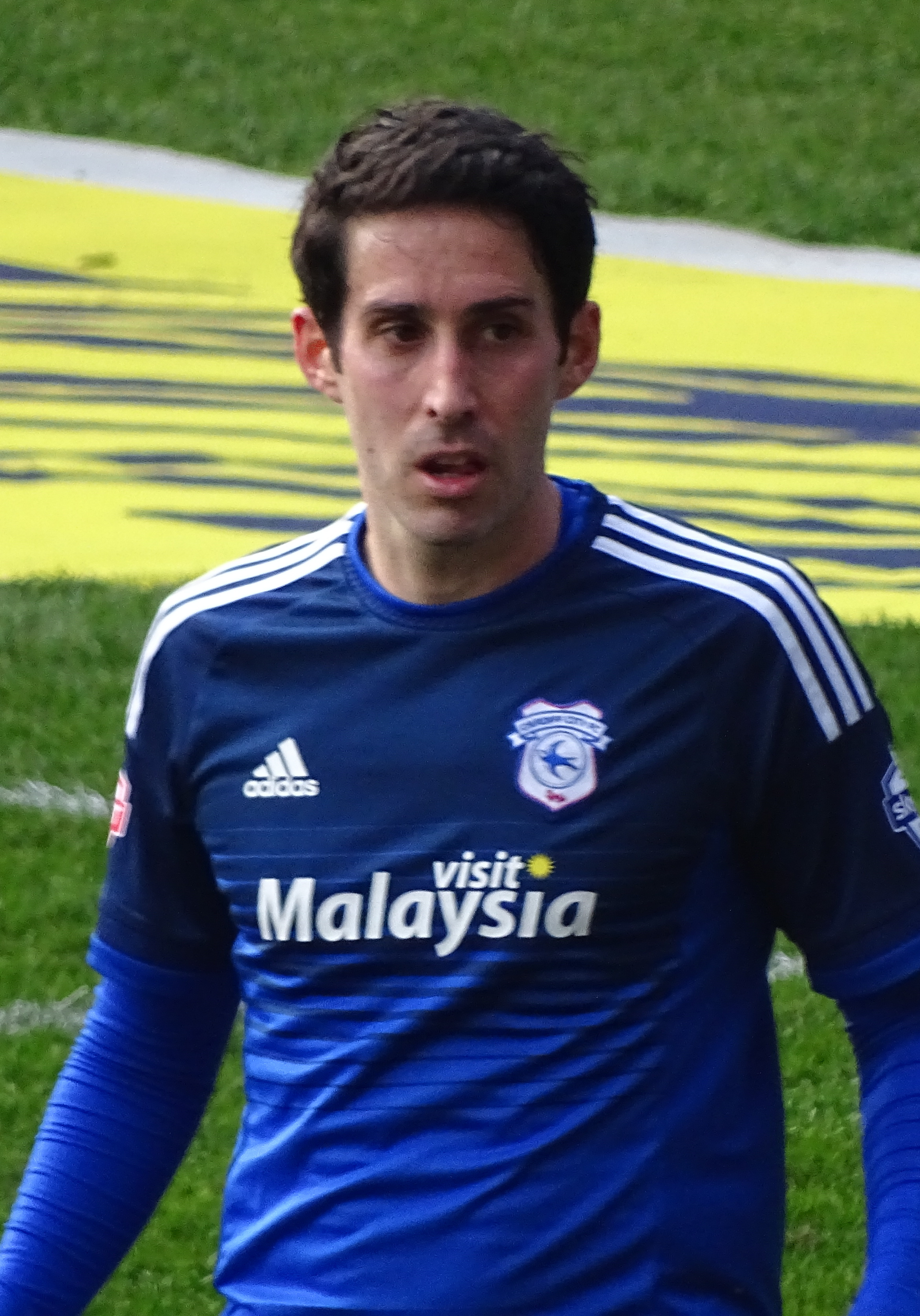
- Whittingham playing for Cardiff City in 2016

Personal information
- Full name: Peter Michael Whittingham
- Date of birth: 8 September 1984
- Place of birth: Nuneaton, England
- Date of death: 18 March 2020 (aged 35)
- Place of death: Cardiff, Wales
- Height: 5 ft 10 in (1.78 m)
- Position: Midfielder

Youth career
- –2001: Coventry City
- 2001–2003: Aston Villa

Senior career*
Years	Team	Apps	(Gls)
2003–2007	Aston Villa	56	(1)
2005	→ Burnley (loan)	7	(0)
2005	→ Derby County (loan)	11	(0)
2007–2017	Cardiff City	413	(85)
2017–2018	Blackburn Rovers	20	(0)
Total		507	(86)

International career
2004–2007	England U21	17	(3)
- * Club domestic league appearances and goals

Peter Michael Whittingham (/ˈhwɪtɪŋəm/; 8 September 1984 – 18 March 2020) was an English professional footballer. His primary position was as a central midfielder, although he also sometimes operated as a wide midfielder on both the left and right.

He was part of the Aston Villa team that won the 2001–02 FA Youth Cup, and a year later he made his Premier League debut. Whittingham had loans at Championship clubs Burnley and Derby County in 2005. In January 2007, he signed for Cardiff City for a fee of £350,000.

In eleven seasons at Cardiff, Whittingham played 457 competitive matches and scored 96 goals, putting him seventh on the all-time appearances list and ninth among their goalscorers. During his time at that club they won the Championship in 2013, and reached the 2008 FA Cup final and 2012 League Cup final. He was named three times in the Championship's PFA Team of the Year, and his 20-goal haul in the 2009–10 season made him the division's top scorer. He signed for Blackburn Rovers in June 2017, and made 24 appearances for the club before his contract was terminated by mutual consent in August 2018. He died in March 2020, as a result of an accidental fall at a pub.

== Early life ==
Whittingham was born in Nuneaton, Warwickshire, and attended King Henry VIII School, Coventry. His father Harry was a well-known fishmonger in the area and was known as "Harry the Fish". His mother worked as a teacher. He has an older brother named James who works as an investment banker for Goldman Sachs.

== Club career ==
=== Coventry City ===
Whittingham began playing football as a youth player with his local side Coventry City, joining the club at the age of seven. His brother had been playing in the club's youth sides and Whittingham had been noticed playing on the side of pitch by one of the club's scouts. Whittingham played with Coventry until the age of 16 but was released in 2001 after the club opted against offering him a contract with officials believing he was too small to play professionally. Coventry scout Ray Gooding, who had argued against his release, instead rang officials at Aston Villa to recommend Whittingham. After a successful trial, he signed for the Midlands club.

=== Aston Villa ===
Whittingham signed with Aston Villa in April 2001 and was part of the club's FA Youth Cup-winning team of 2002. He was handed his first team debut on 21 April 2003 by manager Graham Taylor against Newcastle United, as a half-time substitution for Gareth Barry in a 1–1 away draw. He made two further substitute appearances before making his first start in the final day of the season in a 3–1 defeat against Leeds United.

Taylor was replaced by David O'Leary ahead of the 2003–04 season, with the Irishman being quick to praise Whittingham's potential. After featuring regularly during the early stages of the campaign, he scored his first senior goal against Wycombe Wanderers in the League Cup third round on 23 September 2003, during a 5–0 win at Adams Park. After the match, O'Leary commented "I've had a good feeling about Peter". In November that year, having been nearly ever-present during the opening stages of the campaign, he signed a contract that would have lasted until 2007. He finished the season having made 39 appearances in all competitions as a left-sided midfielder, including playing six times in the club's League Cup run where they reached the semi-final before losing to Bolton Wanderers, a match in which Whittingham was later branded a "scapegoat" for his side's defeat. Nevertheless, he was named Villa's young player of the season for the campaign.

The following season, Whittingham began the campaign as a regular substitute and scored his only league goal for Villa on 6 November 2004, opening a 3–0 win over Portsmouth at Villa Park. However, he gradually fell out of favour as the side struggled and, on 14 February 2005, Whittingham signed for Championship club Burnley on a one-month loan having not featured for Villa for nearly two months. Having featured predominantly as a left-sided player during the early stages of his career, Burnley manager Steve Cotterill hoped Whittingham would make an impact as a central midfielder at the club, and hoped that he would do as well as Gary Cahill, another young player they had taken on loan from Villa. Whittingham made his debut for Burnley in a 1–1 draw with Crewe Alexandra the following day. Whittingham started all nine matches of his loan spell, seven in the league and two in the FA Cup, before returning to Villa in late-March, despite Cotterill's hopes of extending the deal.

Whittingham started three of Villa's opening four matches of the 2005–06 season, but returned to the Championship on 15 September, joining Derby County on a three-month loan. He made his debut for Derby three days later in a 2–2 draw with Southampton, making a total of 11 appearances without scoring before returning to Villa in November 2005.

=== Cardiff City ===
On 11 January 2007, after making just five appearances for Villa since the end of his loan spell with Derby more than a year previously, Whittingham was transferred to Cardiff City for a reported fee of £350,000. He quickly established himself in the team and was a first-team member until the end of the year, despite competition from Joe Ledley on the left-hand side.

Whittingham began the 2007–08 season on the bench. By mid-November Cardiff found themselves just above the relegation zone; this prompted a minor reshuffle from boss Dave Jones that involved Chris Gunter and Whittingham returning to the starting line-up. Whittingham's recall saw him moved to an unfamiliar role on the right side of midfield, but he soon settled into the role and started the majority of the remaining matches of the season, as well as being the team's top scorer (with three goals) during their FA Cup run. That run saw him score in matches against Chasetown, Wolverhampton Wanderers and Middlesbrough, before Cardiff eventually lost 1–0 to Portsmouth in the final.

The start of the 2008–09 season saw Whittingham continue playing on the right side of midfield, scoring his first goal of the season on 26 August in a 2–1 victory over Milton Keynes Dons in the League Cup. He ruptured ankle ligaments during a 2–1 win over Crystal Palace on 15 November, which was expected to keep him out for up to three months. However, he returned to the team ahead of schedule, coming on as a late substitute during a 1–1 draw with Reading on 26 December.

In the first match of the 2009–10 season, Whittingham converted a penalty during a 4–0 win over Scunthorpe United in the first ever competitive match at the Cardiff City Stadium and scored in consecutive rounds of the League Cup in wins over Dagenham & Redbridge and Bristol Rovers. Having been appointed the first-choice penalty taker for the club, he took his league goal tally to three with goals in consecutive matches in a 3–1 defeat to against Sheffield Wednesday followed by a 6–1 win over Derby County. He continued his scoring form with a brace against Watford and goals against Crystal Palace and Coventry City followed by a hat-trick against Sheffield United. Whittingham earned the October Player of the Month award on 14 November 2009. On 24 April, he scored a free-kick during a 3–2 win over Sheffield Wednesday, and the following day was named in the 2009–10 PFA Team of the Year for the Championship.

Following the loan arrival of Craig Bellamy, Whittingham started the 2010–11 season in a new central midfield role. His performances were praised by manager Dave Jones. After scoring eight penalties in the previous campaign, Whittingham saw his first two penalties saved in this campaign, causing Jones to announce that Whittingham had been taken off penalty duty. However, he did take and score Cardiff's next penalty against Coventry City in a 2–1 win which added to his first two goals of the season scored from a brace of free kicks scored against Bristol City three days previously. Whittingham scored a fantastic volley against Barnsley on 13 March, which ended up being voted Football League Goal of the Year award for 2011. At the end of the season, Cardiff failed to gain promotion for a second year running and Whittingham was heavily linked with a move away from Cardiff City Stadium, being linked with newly promoted Norwich City and Portsmouth.

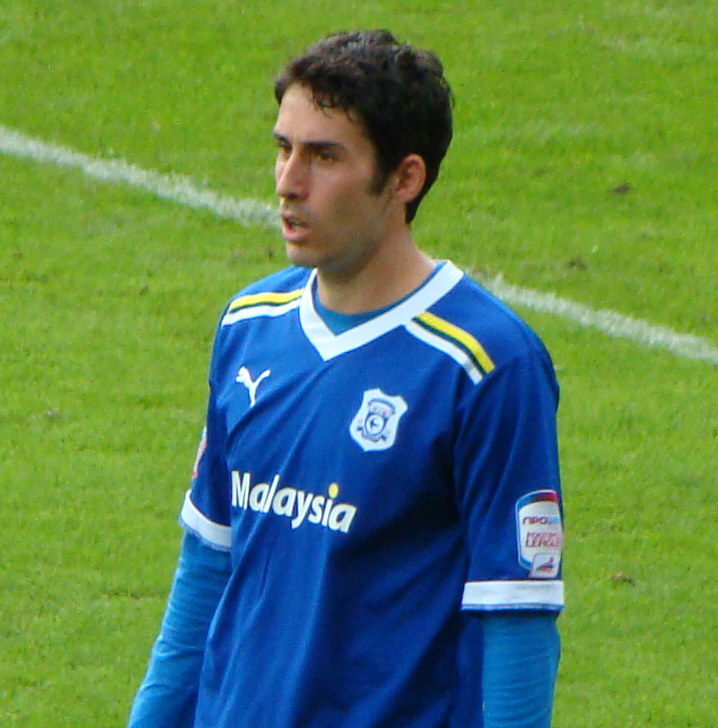
Whittingham playing for Cardiff City in 2011

Despite the links with a move away from the Welsh capital, new Cardiff boss, Malky Mackay insisted that Whittingham was central to his plans. Whittingham started the first match against West Ham United, and scored his first goal of the season against Oxford United after coming on for Solomon Taiwo. Whittingham made his 300th league appearance in a 1–1 draw with Burnley. On 26 August, Whittingham signed a contract extension to keep him at the club until at least the summer of 2014. Whittingham played a big role in Cardiff's centre midfield, producing many impressive performances and scoring several fine goals, including direct freekicks against Peterborough and Crystal Palace as well as a sublime chip from 35 yards away to Reading. His 50th league goal for Cardiff came on 22 November against Coventry City. His four goals in five matches led to Whittingham being nominated for the November Championship Player of the Month.

On 30 December 2011, Mackay revealed that the club had rejected a bid, thought to be around £3 million, from West Ham United for Whittingham. Following a goal scoring drought, Whittingham scored a penalty against Leicester in February and then scored straight from a corner against Peterborough. In February, Whittingham was nominated for the Championship Player of the Year award. Whittingham was part of all the matches in the League Cup campaign, which eventually saw Cardiff lose 3–2 on penalties to Liverpool in the final at Wembley Stadium. He made his 250th Cardiff appearance in a 2–2 draw with Brighton & Hove Albion, in which he scored on 7 March. Whittingham was voted the best player outside the Premier League in FourFourTwo magazine. Whittingham then won his second Cardiff City player of the year award at the end of the season. He was later named in the PFA Team of the Year for the Championship.

During the close season, more speculation about Whittingham's future in the Welsh capital arose, this time from Premier League club West Bromwich Albion. Whittingham said that he was fully committed to Cardiff, stating: "I'm happy here and until the gaffer [Malky Mackay] wants to sell me I'm here." On 28 August 2012, Whittingham signed a new 3-year deal at Cardiff, ending speculation on his future. Whittingham opened his scoring account for the 2012–13 season, on 2 September with a hat-trick in a 3–1 home win over Wolverhampton Wanderers. He then scored his fourth during the following match, converting a penalty against Leeds United, his 350th career appearance. After a drop in form, Whittingham was left out of the team towards the close of the season, but managed his eighth and final goal of the campaign with a last-minute penalty at home to Blackburn Rovers on 1 April. Whittingham collected a winner's medal as Cardiff lifted the Championship trophy following April's home encounter with Bolton Wanderers.

Cardiff's debut Premier League season started off brightly with wins over champions Manchester City and Fulham. Whittingham scored his first Premier League goal in nine years against Hull City. Despite the bright start, Cardiff were eventually relegated after just one season.

In July 2014, Whittingham signed a new three-year deal keeping him till in the Welsh capital until 2017. Despite a disappointing campaign for the Bluebirds, who finished in 11th, their lowest finish in 8 years, Whittingham was selected in The Football Manager Team of the Decade at the Football League Awards, on 19 April.

Cardiff rejected two bids from unnamed clubs for Whittingham in the summer of 2015 and he was described as the club's kingpin, by manager Russell Slade. Whittingham scored twice in a 4–1 win over Brighton & Hove Albion and overtook John Toshack and Hughie Ferguson in the club's all-time leading scorers list in English league competitions. Cardiff missed out on the play-offs at the end of the season.

Whittingham played less frequently for Cardiff after Neil Warnock was appointed manager in October 2016. As it was expected that his contract would expire at the end of the season, he received a standing ovation when substituted in his final home match, against Newcastle in 2017.

In July 2022, two years after Whittingham's death, Cardiff retired the number 7 shirt as a tribute.

=== Blackburn Rovers ===
On 13 June 2017, Whittingham joined newly relegated League One club Blackburn Rovers on a two-year contract effective from the expiration of his Cardiff contract in July. Warnock praised him for his loyalty to the club, and had offered Whittingham a one-year contract extension but made it clear that he would feature less often than he had done before.

He made his Rovers debut on 6 August, playing the full 90 minutes as they began the season with a 2–1 loss at Southend United.

Whittingham had his contract with Blackburn terminated by mutual consent on 31 August 2018.

== International career ==
Whittingham was an England under-21 international, making his debut against the Netherlands in 2004 and was part of the squad that competed in the 2007 UEFA European Under-21 Championship held in the Netherlands. He made one substitute appearance during the tournament, coming on late in a 2–2 draw with Italy.

Whittingham scored three goals for the under-21 team. He scored his first two in a match against Wales before scoring his last goal in a match against Norway in February 2006.

== Personal life ==
At the time of his death, he lived in Dinas Powys, Vale of Glamorgan with his wife Amanda and their son; their second son was born two months after his death.

== Death ==
On 18 March 2020, South Wales Police confirmed that Whittingham was in hospital after suffering head injuries as a result of an accidental fall at a pub in Barry on 7 March. He died from his injuries on 18 March at the University Hospital of Wales in Cardiff, aged 35.

In March 2021, Pontypridd Coroner's Court recorded a verdict of accidental death, concluding that Whittingham was intoxicated and engaged in "horseplay" with friends before falling through a fire door and down a flight of stairs.

=== Legacy ===
In the immediate aftermath of Whittingham's death tributes were paid across the football world, including Whittingham's former clubs Aston Villa, Cardiff City and Blackburn Rovers along with players such as Elliott Bennett and Mark Bright. The English Football League, The Football Association of England and the Football Association of Wales also issued messages of condolence.

In 2021, Whittingham's wife Amanda, brother James, sister Rachel and mother Sally founded a Registered Charity in his honour, named The PW7 Foundation. The Foundation raised money for three causes; The Cardiff City FC Foundation, which aimed to support children in Cardiff through football, a sports bursary at King Henry VIII School in Coventry (Peter's old school) and Winston's Wish, a charity that supports children who have lost a parent or sibling.

A tribute friendly was organised between Cardiff City and Aston Villa, which took place on 30 November 2022, during the break in both teams' respective leagues due to the 2022 FIFA World Cup. The ticket sales for that match at the Cardiff City Stadium raised money for the PW7 Foundation.

Cardiff City also retired the number 7 shirt in his honour.

== Career statistics ==
Appearances and goals by club, season and competition
Club	Season	League			FA Cup		League Cup		Other		Total	
Club	Season	Division	Apps	Goals	Apps	Goals	Apps	Goals	Apps	Goals	Apps	Goals
Aston Villa	2002–03	Premier League	4	0	0	0	0	0	0	0	4	0
Aston Villa	2003–04	Premier League	32	0	1	0	6	1	—		39	1
Aston Villa	2004–05	Premier League	13	1	0	0	2	0	—		15	1
Aston Villa	2005–06	Premier League	4	0	0	0	0	0	—		4	0
Aston Villa	2006–07	Premier League	3	0	0	0	1	0	—		4	0
Aston Villa	Total		56	1	1	0	9	1	0	0	66	2
Burnley (loan)	2004–05	Championship	7	0	2	0	—		—		9	0
Derby County (loan)	2005–06	Championship	11	0	—		—		—		11	0
Cardiff City	2006–07	Championship	19	4	0	0	—		—		19	4
Cardiff City	2007–08	Championship	41	5	6	3	4	1	—		51	9
Cardiff City	2008–09 (Note: Soccerbase has incorrect stats for the 2008–09 season having missed a substitute appearance in a match against Queens Park Rangers on 25 February 2009)	Championship	33	3	2	0	3	1	—		38	4
Cardiff City	2009–10	Championship	41	20	4	1	3	2	3 (Note: Appearances in Championship play-offs)	2	51	25
Cardiff City	2010–11	Championship	45	11	1	0	2	0	2	0	50	11
Cardiff City	2011–12	Championship	46	12	0	0	7	1	2	0	55	13
Cardiff City	2012–13	Championship	40	8	0	0	0	0	—		40	8
Cardiff City	2013–14	Premier League	32	3	2	0	0	0	—		34	3
Cardiff City	2014–15	Championship	43	6	2	0	0	0	—		45	6
Cardiff City	2015–16	Championship	36	6	1	0	0	0	—		37	6
Cardiff City	2016–17	Championship	37	7	0	0	0	0	—		37	7
Cardiff City	Total		413	85	18	4	19	5	7	2	457	96
Blackburn Rovers	2017–18	League One	20	0	0	0	1	0	2 (Note: Appearances in EFL Trophy)	0	23	0
Blackburn Rovers	2018–19	Championship	0	0	—		1	0	—		1	0
Blackburn Rovers	Total		20	0	0	0	2	0	2	0	24	0
Career total			507	86	21	4	30	6	9	2	567	98

== Honours ==
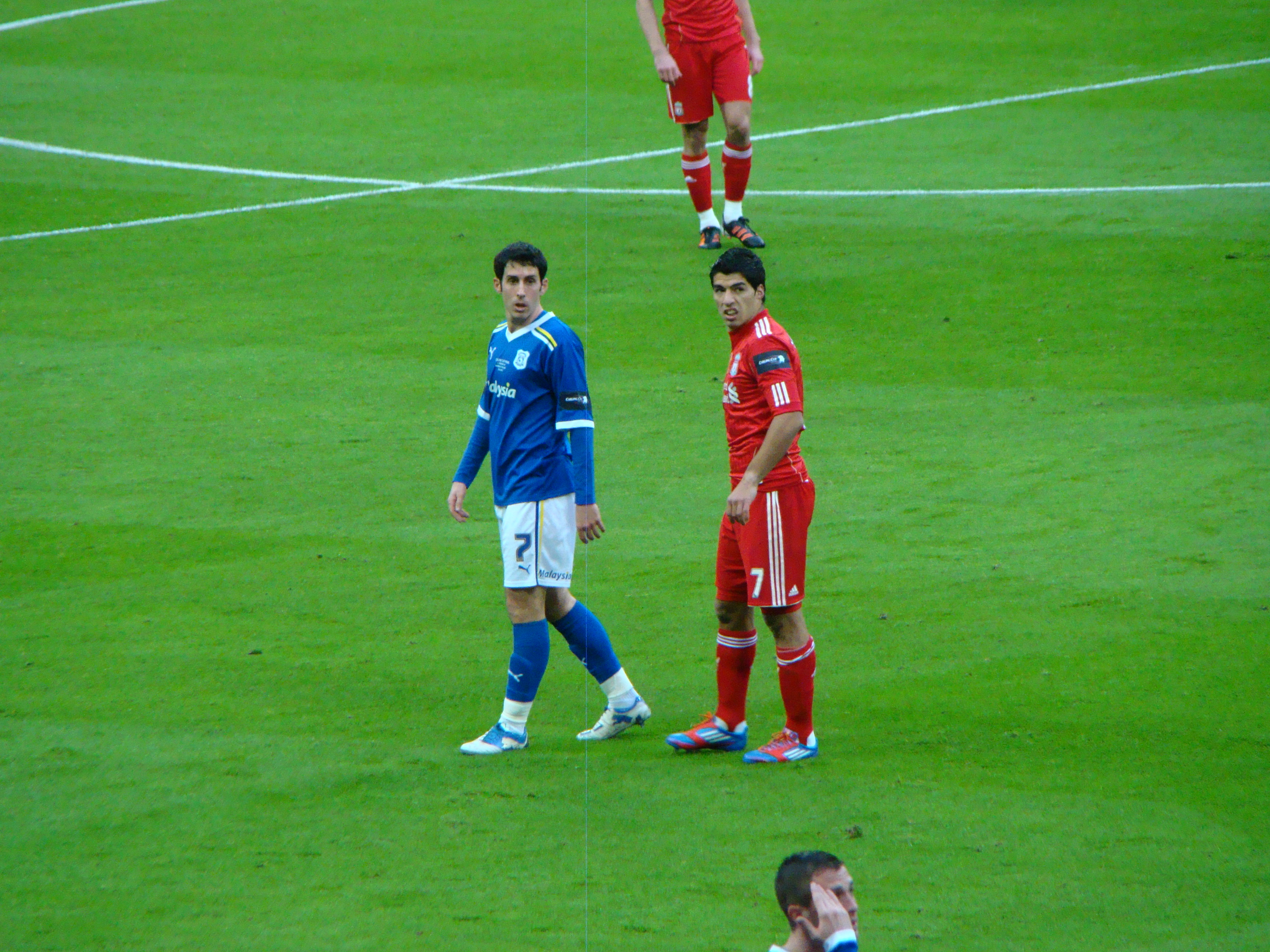
Whittingham (in blue) and Liverpool's Luis Suárez in the 2012 League Cup final

Aston Villa

- FA Youth Cup: 2001–02

Cardiff City

- Football League Championship: 2012–13
- FA Cup runner-up: 2007–08
- Football League Cup runner-up: 2011–12

Blackburn Rovers

- EFL League One runner-up: 2017–18

Individual

- Football League Championship Golden Boot: 2009–10
- PFA Team of the Year: 2009–10 Championship, 2011–12 Championship, 2012–13 Championship
- Football League Championship Player of the Month: October 2009
- Cardiff City Player of the Year: 2009–10, 2011–12
- The Football League Goal of the Year: 2011
- The Football League Team of the Decade
