= 2009–10 Cardiff City F.C. season =

Welsh football club season

Cardiff City
2009–10 season
- Chairman: Peter Ridsdale
- Manager: Dave Jones
- Football League Championship: 4th
- FA Cup: Fifth round (eliminated by Chelsea)
- League Cup: Third round (eliminated by Aston Villa)
- Top goalscorer: League: Peter Whittingham (20); All: Peter Whittingham (26)
- Highest home attendance: 26,033 vs Leicester City, 11 May
- Lowest home attendance: 5,545 vs Dagenham & Redbridge, 11 August
- Average home league attendance: 19,413
Home colours	Away colours

The 2009–10 season was Cardiff City F.C.'s 83rd season in The Football League since joining in 1920. The season was also the club's first in the Cardiff City Stadium, replacing their former ground Ninian Park, which had been used by the club for 99 years. Cardiff had their most successful season in the Football League Championship finishing 4th making the play-offs for the Premier League. Cardiff narrowly missed out on promotion after losing 3–2 to Blackpool in the Final.

== Events ==
- 26 June 2009 – Cardiff City pen a five-year kit manufacturing deal with Puma.
- 4 July 2009 – Cardiff City break their record transfer fee with the £3 million signing of Michael Chopra from Sunderland.
- 22 July 2009 – Cardiff City Stadium is officially opened with a 0–0 draw against with Celtic.
- 7 August 2009 – Mark Hudson is named club captain.
- 11 September 2009 – Cardiff City agree a one-year shirt sponsorship deal with 777ball.com.
- 28 September 2009 – SBOBET are announced as replacement sponsors following the withdrawal of 777ball.com due to licensing problems.
- 7 November 2009 – Dave Jones receives Championship Manager of the Month for October.
- 14 November 2009 – Peter Whittingham receives Player of the Month for October.
- 20 November 2009 – Midfielder Stephen McPhail is diagnosed with stage one lymphoma, a rare form of cancer.
- 25 November 2009 – Datuk Chan Tien Ghee is appointed on the board of directors.
- 28 November 2009 – Goalkeeper Peter Enckelman is involved in a car crash but made a "luck escape" playing 45 mins the following day.
- 4 December 2009 – Club secretary, Jason Turner is suspended.
- 11 December 2009 – Cardiff City agree a settlement with Langston Corporation, over taking any more legal action over the clubs debt.
- 17 December 2009 – Riccardo Scimeca is forced to retire at the age of 34 due to injury.
- 29 January 2010 – Captain Mark Hudson is ruled out for 10–12 weeks with a split ankle tendon.
- 9 April 2010 – Gavin Rae is confirmed to be out for the season with a ruptured tendon in his ankle.

== Football League Championship ==
=== Standings ===
Pos	Team	Pld	W	D	L	GF	GA	GD	Pts	Promotion, qualification or relegation
2	West Bromwich Albion (P)	46	26	13	7	89	48	+41	91	Promotion to the Premier League
3	Nottingham Forest	46	22	13	11	65	40	+25	79	Qualification for Championship play-offs
4	Cardiff City	46	22	10	14	73	54	+19	76	Qualification for Championship play-offs
5	Leicester City	46	21	13	12	61	45	+16	76	Qualification for Championship play-offs
6	Blackpool (O, P)	46	19	13	14	74	58	+16	70	Qualification for Championship play-offs

Source: The Football League
Rules for classification: 1) points; 2) goal difference; 3) number of goals scored.
(O) Play-off winners; (P) Promoted

=== Results summary ===
Overall								Home						Away					
Pld	W	D	L	GF	GA	GD	Pts	W	D	L	GF	GA	GD	W	D	L	GF	GA	GD
46	22	10	14	73	54	+19	76	12	6	5	37	20	+17	10	4	9	36	34	+2

Last updated: 2 May.

=== Results by round ===
Round	1	2	3	4	5	6	7	8	9	10	11	12	13	14	15	16	17	18	19	20	21	22	23	24	25	26	27	28	29	30	31	32	33	34	35	36	37	38	39	40	41	42	43	44	45	46
Ground	H	A	A	H	A	H	A	H	A	H	A	H	H	A	H	A	A	H	H	A	A	H	A	H	A	A	H	A	H	H	H	A	H	A	A	A	H	H	A	H	H	A	H	A	H	A
Result	W	D	W	W	L	L	W	L	L	W	W	D	W	W	D	L	L	L	W	W	W	L	D	D	D	W	W	L	W	D	L	L	W	L	L	W	W	D	W	W	W	D	D	W	W	L
Position	1	2	1	1	2	8	4	6	9	5	4	3	3	2	3	3	5	8	5	3	3	5	4	4	5	4	4	4	4	5	5	6	6	6	6	6	6	6	4	4	4	4	4	4	4	4

Updated to match(es) played on 2 May. Source:
A = Away; H = Home; W = Win; D = Draw; L = Loss

== Kit ==
Supplier: Puma
Sponsor(s): 777.com (13 Sep)
SBOBET (from 29 Sep)

Home	Away	Away Alternate	GK Home	GK Away	GK Alternate

Last updated: 18 September 2012.
Source: Historical Football kits

== Squad ==
As of 16 February 2010

No.	Name	Nat.	Place of birth	Date of birth	Club apps.	Club goals	Int. caps	Int. goals	Previous club	Date joined	Fee	Contract end
1	David Marshall	(Scotland)	Glasgow	5 March 1985	–	–	5	0	Norwich City	12 May 2009	£500,000	2012
2	Kevin McNaughton	(Scotland)	Dundee	28 August 1982	131	2	4	0	Aberdeen	26 May 2006	Free	2011
3	Mark Kennedy	(Republic of Ireland)	Dublin	15 May 1976	40	0	34	4	Crystal Palace	10 July 2008	Free	2011
4	Gavin Rae	(Scotland)	Aberdeen	28 November 1977	101	5	14	0	Rangers	7 October 2007	Free	2011
5	Mark Hudson	(England)	Guildford	30 March 1982	–	–	–	–	Charlton Athletic	2 July 2009	£1,075,000	2012
6	Gábor Gyepes	(Hungary)	Budapest	26 June 1981	29	1	22	1	Northampton Town	19 August 2008	£200,000	2013
7	Peter Whittingham	(England)	Nuneaton	8 September 1984	108	17	–	–	Aston Villa	11 January 2007	£350,000	2011
8	Michael Chopra	(England)	Newcastle upon Tyne	23 December 1983	71	31	–	–	Sunderland	1 July 2009	£3,000,000	2012
9	Jay Bothroyd	(England)	London	5 May 1982	44	12	–	–	Wolverhampton Wanderers	4 August 2008	£350,000	2011
10	Stephen McPhail	(Republic of Ireland)	London (England)	9 December 1979	107	3	10	1	Barnsley	13 June 2006	Free	2011
11	Chris Burke	(Scotland)	Glasgow	2 December 1983	16	1	1	0	Rangers	9 January 2009	Free	2011
12	Tony Capaldi	(Northern Ireland)	Porsgrunn (Norway)	12 August 1981	60	0	22	0	Plymouth Argyle	25 May 2007	Free	2010
14	Paul Quinn	(Scotland)	Wishaw	21 July 1985	–	–	–	–	Motherwell	4 June 2009	£300,000	2012
15	Anthony Gerrard	(England)	Liverpool	6 February 1986	–	–	–	–	Walsall	2 July 2009	£200,000	2013
16	Joe Ledley	(Wales)	Cardiff	23 January 1987	220	26	12	1	N/A	1 June 2004	Trainee	2010
17	Kelvin Etuhu	(Nigeria)	Kano	30 May 1988	–	–	–	–	Manchester City	22 August 2009	Loan	2010
18	Solomon Taiwo	(Nigeria)	Lagos	29 April 1985	–	–	–	–	Dagenham & Redbridge	25 August 2009	£250,000	2012
20	Peter Enckelman	(Finland)	Turku	10 March 1977	35	0	11	0	Blackburn Rovers	18 July 2008	Free	2010
23	Darcy Blake	(Wales)	New Tredegar	13 December 1988	36	0	–	–	N/A	1 June 2005	Trainee	2011
24	Miguel Comminges	(Guadeloupe)	Les Abymes	16 March 1982	33	0	15	0	Swindon Town	1 June 2008	Free	2010
26	Warren Feeney	(Northern Ireland)	Belfast	17 January 1981	12	0	27	5	Luton Town	22 March 2007	Free	2011
27	Adam Matthews	(Wales)	Swansea	13 January 1992	–	–	–	–	N/A	14 January 2009	Trainee	2011
28	Aaron Wildig	(England)	Hereford	15 April 1992	–	–	–	–	N/A	15 April 2009	Trainee	2012
29	Josh Magennis	(Northern Ireland)	Bangor	15 August 1990	–	–	–	–	N/A	1 June 2009	Trainee	2010
32	Aaron Morris	(Wales)	Cardiff	30 December 1989	3	0	–	–	N/A	1 June 2007	Trainee	2010
44	Ross McCormack	(Scotland)	Glasgow	18 August 1984	44	23	1	0	Motherwell	28 June 2008	Free	2014

=== Statistics ===
As of 22 May 2010

No.	Pos	Nat	Player	Total		Championship		FA Cup		League Cup		Play-offs	
No.	Pos	Nat	Player	Apps	Goals	Apps	Goals	Apps	Goals	Apps	Goals	Apps	Goals
1	GK	(Scotland) SCO	David Marshall	50	0	43	0	4	0	0	0	3	0
2	DF	(Scotland) SCO	Kevin McNaughton	26	0	20+1	0	2	0	0	0	3	0
3	MF	(Republic of Ireland) IRL	Mark Kennedy	36	0	25+5	0	2+1	0	0	0	3	0
4	MF	(Scotland) SCO	Gavin Rae	42	2	28+9	1	2	0	3	1	0	0
5	DF	(England) ENG	Mark Hudson	33	2	26+1	2	2	0	1	0	3	0
6	DF	(Hungary) HUN	Gábor Gyepes	20	1	16	1	2	0	2	0	0	0
7	MF	(England) ENG	Peter Whittingham	51	25	41	20	4	1	3	2	3	2
8	FW	(England) ENG	Michael Chopra	51	21	36+5	16	3+1	2	2+1	1	3	2
9	FW	(England) ENG	Jay Bothroyd	48	13	40	11	3	1	2	1	3	0
10	MF	(Republic of Ireland) IRL	Stephen McPhail	26	0	21	0	0	0	2	0	3	0
11	MF	(Scotland) SCO	Chris Burke	52	10	38+6	9	2+1	1	2	0	3	0
12	DF	(Northern Ireland) NIR	Tony Capaldi	18	0	10+5	0	0	0	3	0	0	0
14	DF	(Scotland) SCO	Paul Quinn	27	0	16+6	0	2	0	2	0	0+1	0
15	DF	(England) ENG	Anthony Gerrard	47	2	39	2	4	0	3	0	0+1	0
16	MF	(Wales) WAL	Joe Ledley	36	4	27+2	3	3	0	1	0	3	1
17	MF	(Nigeria) NGR	Kelvin Etuhu	20	0	7+9	0	0	0	1	0	0+3	0
18	MF	(Nigeria) NGR	Solomon Taiwo	10	0	2+6	0	0+2	0	0	0	0	0
19	MF	(England) ENG	Riccardo Scimeca*	6	0	2+2	0	0	0	1+1	0	0	0
20	GK	(Finland) FIN	Peter Enckelman	7	0	3+1	0	0	0	3	0	0	0
23	DF	(Wales) WAL	Darcy Blake	24	0	15+3	0	1+2	0	0	0	3	0
24	DF	(Guadeloupe) GLP	Miguel Comminges	2	0	0+1	0	0	0	1	0	0	0
26	FW	(Northern Ireland) NIR	Warren Feeney	10	0	1+8	0	0+1	0	0	0	0	0
27	DF	(Wales) WAL	Adam Matthews	35	1	24+8	1	2	0	1	0	0	0
28	MF	(England) ENG	Aaron Wildig	17	1	4+7	1	3	0	0+3	0	0	0
29	FW	(Northern Ireland) NIR	Josh Magennis	10	1	1+8	0	0	0	0+1	1	0	0
32	DF	(Wales) WAL	Aaron Morris	1	0	0+1	0	0	0	0	0	0	0
44	FW	(Scotland) SCO	Ross McCormack	41	5	21+13	4	3+1	1	0	0	0+3	0
49	MF	(Wales) WAL	Jonathan Meades	0	0	0	0	0	0	0	0	0	0
—	DF	(Republic of Ireland) IRL	Darren Dennehy	0	0	0	0	0	0	0	0	0	0

- * Indicates player left club during the season.

==== Captains ====
Number	Pos	Player	Starts (as captain)
5	DF	Mark Hudson	32
9	FW	Jay Bothroyd	17
10	MF	Stephen McPhail	4
16	MF	Joe Ledley	2
8	FW	Michael Chopra	1

==== Disciplinary record ====
Number	Pos	Player	Yellow card	Red card
9	FW	Jay Bothroyd	13	0
8	FW	Michael Chopra	12	0
16	MF	Joe Ledley	3	1
14	DF	Paul Quinn	8	0
6	DF	Gábor Gyepes	2	1
10	MF	Stephen McPhail	2	1
15	DF	Anthony Gerrard	6	0
12	DF	Tony Capaldi	0	1
44	FW	Ross McCormack	6	0
5	DF	Mark Hudson	3	0
11	MF	Chris Burke	2	0
26	FW	Warren Feeney	2	0
1	GK	David Marshall	2	0
2	DF	Kevin McNaughton	2	0
4	MF	Gavin Rae	2	0
7	MF	Peter Whittingham	2	0
23	MF	Darcy Blake	1	0
17	MF	Kelvin Etuhu	1	0
3	DF	Mark Kennedy	1	0
27	DF	Adam Matthews	1	0
18	MF	Solomon Taiwo	1	0

=== Contracts ===
No.	Pos.	Nat.	Name	Age	Status	Contract length	Expiry date	Source
44	FW	(Scotland)	McCormack	22	✓ Signed	4 years	June 2013	BBC Sport
16	MF	(Wales)	Ledley	23	✗ Rejected	4 years	June 2013	South Wales Echo

== Transfers ==
=== In ===
No.	Pos.	Nat.	Name	Age	EU	Moving from	Type	Transfer window	Ends	Transfer fee	Source
1	GK	(Scotland)	Marshall	24	EU	Norwich City (England)	Transfer	Summer	2012	£500,000	Cardiff City
5	DF	(England)	Hudson	27	EU	Charlton Athletic (England)	Transfer	Summer	2012	£1,075,000	BBC Sport
15	DF	(England)	Gerrard	23	EU	Walsall (England)	Transfer	Summer	2013	£200,000	Cardiff City
14	DF	(Scotland)	Quinn	23	EU	Motherwell (Scotland)	Transfer	Summer	2012	£300,000	BBC Sport
8	FW	(England)	Chopra	25	EU	Sunderland (England)	Transfer	Summer	2012	£3,000,000	BBC Sport
18	MF	(Nigeria)	Taiwo	24	EU	Dagenham & Redbridge (England)	Transfer	Summer	2012	£250,000	BBC Sport

- Total spent: ▼ ~ £5,250,750

=== Loans in ===
No.	Pos.	Name	Country	Age	Loan club	Started	Ended	Start source	End source
17	MF	Etuhu	(Nigeria)	23	Manchester City	23 August	30 June	Cardiff City	Cardiff City

Sources: For loan start source see "Start source". For loan end source see "End source".
EU = if holds or not a European Union passport; Country: when 2 flags, 1st flag = country that plays for internationally, 2nd flag = country of birth; No. = number on jersey; P = Position (for position name, pause mouse pointer on abbreviation); Name = Name on jersey (for more extensive name, pause mouse pointer on name); In/Out = In: The player came in on loan, Out: The player went out on loan; Loan club = the club that the player moved on loan to or the club that the player came from on loan; Started = the date when the player's loan started; Ended = the date when the player's loan ended.

=== Out ===
No.	Pos.	Name	Country	Age	Type	Moving to	Transfer window	Transfer fee	Apps	Goals	Source
29	MF	Brown	(Wales)	19	Free Transfer	Bryntirion Athletic	Summer	Free	1	0	South Wales Echo
5	DF	Purse	(England)	32	Free Transfer	Sheffield Wednesday (England)	Summer	Free	123	12	Sheffield Wednesday
12	DF	Johnson	(England)	26	Transfer	Birmingham City (England)	Summer	£5,000,000	136	14	Birmingham City
17	MF	Parry	(Wales)	28	Transfer	Preston North End (England)	Summer	£300,000	214	27	BBC Sport
25	GK	Sak	(Poland)	19	Free Transfer	Wrexham	Summer	Free	0	0	The Leader

EU = if holds or not a European Union passport; Country: when 2 flags, 1st flag = country that plays for internationally, 2nd flag = country of birth; N = number on jersey; P = Position (for position name, pause mouse pointer on abbreviation); Name = Name on jersey (for more extensive name, pause mouse pointer on name); Age = age on the day of the signing; Moving from = only indicate the club the player was playing before start playing for this club in this season, for the type of the moving see Status column; Moving to = only indicates the club the player is going to play next, for the type of the moving see Status column; Ends = when the player's current contract ends; n/a = Not applicable; Apps = Total number of competitive appearances (including substitute appearances) at the club prior to departure; Goals = Total number of competitive goals scored at the club prior to departure.
- Total income: ▲ ~ £5,300,000

=== Loans out ===
No.	Pos.	Name	Country	Age	Loan club	Started	Ended	Start source	End source
—	DF	Dennehy	(Republic of Ireland)	21	Hereford United	2 July	23 August	Hereford United	Hereford United
23	DF	Blake	(Wales)	21	Plymouth Argyle	28 August	1 January	Plymouth Argyle	Cardiff City
29	FW	Magennis	(Northern Ireland)	19	Grimsby Town	15 October	15 November	BBC Sport	Grimsby Town
26	FW	Feeney	(Northern Ireland)	28	Sheffield Wednesday	26 November	28 December	Cardiff City	
12	DF	Capaldi	(Northern Ireland)	28	Leeds United	26 November	6 January	Leeds United	BBC Sport
32	DF	Morris	(Wales)	20	Newport County	23 December	28 February	South Wales Argus	
—	DF	Dennehy	(Republic of Ireland)	21	Gillingham	21 January	29 April	BBC Sport	South Wales Echo

Sources: For loan start source see "Start source". For loan end source see "End source".
EU = if holds or not a European Union passport; Country: when 2 flags, 1st flag = country that plays for internationally, 2nd flag = country of birth; No. = number on jersey; P = Position (for position name, pause mouse pointer on abbreviation); Name = Name on jersey (for more extensive name, pause mouse pointer on name); In/Out = In: The player came in on loan, Out: The player went out on loan; Loan club = the club that the player moved on loan to or the club that the player came from on loan; Started = the date when the player's loan started; Ended = the date when the player's loan ended.

== Fixtures & results ==
=== Pre-season friendlies ===
Date	Opponent	Venue	Result	Attendance	Scorers
10 Jul	Chasetown (Southern Football League Division One Midlands)	H	W 4 – 0	–	Bothroyd, Chopra, Magennis, Matthews
15 Jul	Fátima (Liga de Honra)	A	W 1 – 0	–	Klimpl
18 Jul	President's XI (Portugal)	N	W 3 – 0	–	Bothroyd (2), Chopra
22 Jul	Celtic (Scottish Premier League)	H	D 0 – 0	15,071	
25 Jul	Swindon Town (Football League One)	A	D 0 – 0	–	
1 Aug	Valencia (La Liga)	H	L 0 – 2	13,010	

=== League ===
8 August 1	Cardiff City	4–0	Scunthorpe United	Cardiff
15:00 BST	Chopra 21', 45+2'; Bothroyd 31'; Whittingham 90+3' (pen.)	report		Stadium: Cardiff City Stadium; Attendance: 22,264; Referee: Jon Moss

15 August 2	Blackpool	1–1	Cardiff City	Blackpool
15:00 BST	Evatt 45+1'	report	12' Chopra	Stadium: Bloomfield Road; Attendance: 7,698; Referee: Grant Hegley

18 August 3	Plymouth Argyle	1–3	Cardiff City	Plymouth
19:45 BST	Gow 90' (pen.)	report	4', 80', 85' (pen.) Chopra; (red card) 90' Capaldi	Stadium: Home Park; Attendance: 11,918; Referee: Russell Booth

23 August 4	Cardiff City	3–0	Bristol City	Cardiff
13:45 BST	McCombe 37' (o.g.); Chopra 45+2'; Rae 66'	report		Stadium: Cardiff City Stadium; Attendance: 20,853; Referee: Kevin Friend

29 August 5	Doncaster Rovers	2–0	Cardiff City	Doncaster
15:00 BST	Lockwood 13'; Hayter 17'	report		Stadium: Keepmoat Stadium; Attendance: 9,742; Referee: Eddie Ilderton

13 September 6	Cardiff City	0–1	Newcastle United	Cardiff
14:05 BST		report	18' Coloccini; (red card) 90+2' Smith	Stadium: Cardiff City Stadium; Attendance: 25,630; Referee: Andy Hall

16 September 7	Reading	0–1	Cardiff City	Reading
20:00 BST		report	58' Burke; (red card) 75' McPhail	Stadium: Madjeski Stadium; Attendance: 16,687; Referee: Anthony Taylor

19 September 8	Cardiff City	0–2	Queens Park Rangers	Cardiff
15:00 BST		report	19', 40' Simpson	Stadium: Cardiff City Stadium; Attendance: 20,121; Referee: Lee Probert

26 September 9	Sheffield Wednesday	3–1	Cardiff City	Sheffield
15:00 BST	Esajas 4'; Varney 48'; Clarke 80'	report	16' (pen.) Whittingham; (red card) 73' Ledley	Stadium: Hillsborough Stadium; Attendance: 18,959; Referee: Michael Oliver

29 September 10	Cardiff City	6–1	Derby County	Cardiff
19:45 BST	Whittingham 10'; Chopra 36', 57', 62', 75'; Burke 75'	report	47' Hulse	Stadium: Cardiff City Stadium; Attendance: 18,670; Referee: Simon Hooper

3 October 11	Watford	0–4	Cardiff City	Watford
15:00 BST		report	24' (pen.), 66' Whittingham; 41' Matthews; 67' Bothroyd	Stadium: Vicarage Road; Attendance: 13,895; Referee: Andy Woolmer

17 October 12	Cardiff City	1–1	Crystal Palace	Cardiff
15:00 BST	Whittingham 19'	report	13' (o.g.) Hudson	Stadium: Cardiff City Stadium; Attendance: 21,457; Referee: Steve Tanner

20 October 13	Cardiff City	2–0	Coventry City	Cardiff
19:45 BST	Gerrard 5'; Whittingham 60' (pen.)	report		Stadium: Cardiff City Stadium; Attendance: 19,038; Referee: Mick Russell

24 October 14	Sheffield United	3–4	Cardiff City	Sheffield
15:00 BST	Henderson 43', 45+3'; Harper 90+4'	report	41' Bothroyd; 45+1' (pen.), 60', 85' Whittingham	Stadium: Bramall Lane; Attendance: 25,021; Referee: Trevor Kettle

1 November 15	Cardiff City	1–1	Nottingham Forest	Cardiff
17:00 GMT	Bothroyd 63'	report	90+1' McGugan	Stadium: Cardiff City Stadium; Attendance: 20,413; Referee: Michael Salisbury

7 November 16	Swansea City	3–2	Cardiff City	Swansea
12:45 GMT	Dyer 9'; Pratley 16', 61'	report	32' Bothroyd; 35' Hudson	Stadium: Liberty Stadium; Attendance: 18,209; Referee: Lee Probert

21 November 17	Barnsley	1–0	Cardiff City	Barnsley
15:00 GMT	Dickinson 90+4'	report		Stadium: Oakwell; Attendance: 11,903; Referee: Kevin Wright

29 November 18	Cardiff City	1–2	Ipswich Town	Cardiff
15:00 GMT	Whittingham 35'	report	73' Walters; 85' Stead	Stadium: Cardiff City Stadium; Attendance: 19,463; Referee: Jarnail Singh

5 December 19	Cardiff City	1–0	Preston North End	Cardiff
15:00 GMT	Burke 55'	report		Stadium: Cardiff City Stadium; Attendance: 18,735; Referee: Roger East

8 December 20	West Bromwich Albion	0–2	Cardiff City	West Bromwich
19:45 GMT	Carson (red card) 82'	report	18' Burke; 85' Whittingham	Stadium: The Hawthorns; Attendance: 20,742; Referee: Anthony Taylor

13 December 21	Middlesbrough	0–1	Cardiff City	Middlesbrough
13:15 GMT		report	61' Burke	Stadium: Riverside Stadium; Attendance: 17,232; Referee: Grant Hegley

19 December	Cardiff City	–	Leicester City	Cardiff
15:00 GMT				Stadium: Cardiff City Stadium

26 December 22	Cardiff City	0–1	Plymouth Argyle	Cardiff
13:00 GMT		report	84' Sawyer	Stadium: Cardiff City Stadium; Attendance: 24,010; Referee: Phil Gibbs

28 December 23	Peterborough United	4–4	Cardiff City	Peterborough
15:00 GMT	Simpson 51', 90+2'; Lee 68'; Boyd 89'	report	6', 23' Ledley; 34' Bothroyd; 38' Whittingham	Stadium: London Road Stadium; Attendance: 9,796; Referee: Dean Whitestone

9 January 24	Cardiff City	1–1	Blackpool	Cardiff
15:00 GMT	Hudson 9'	report	46' Adam	Stadium: Cardiff City Stadium; Attendance: 19,147; Referee: Gavin Ward

16 January 25	Scunthorpe United	1–1	Cardiff City	Scunthorpe
15:00 GMT	O'Connor 11'	report	82' Whittingham	Stadium: Glanford Park; Attendance: 5,032; Referee: Scott Mathieson

26 January 26	Bristol City	0–6	Cardiff City	Bristol
19:45 GMT		report	19' Whittingham; 23', 57' McCormack; 24', 46' Chopra; 43' (o.g.) Fontaine	Stadium: Ashton Gate; Attendance: 13,825; Referee: Andy D'Urso

30 January 27	Cardiff City	2–1	Doncaster Rovers	Cardiff
15:00 GMT	Chopra 9'; Bothroyd 90+2'	report	65' Roberts	Stadium: Cardiff City Stadium; Attendance: 19,730; Referee: Graham Scott

5 February 28	Newcastle United	5–1	Cardiff City	Newcastle upon Tyne
19:45 GMT	Carroll 3', 15'; Gyepes 6' (o.g.); Løvenkrands 69', 82'	report	89' Wildig	Stadium: St James' Park; Attendance: 44,028; Referee: Kevin Friend

9 February 29	Cardiff City	2–0	Peterborough United	Cardiff
19:45 GMT	Burke 30'; Gerrard 78'	report		Stadium: Cardiff City Stadium; Attendance: 17,686; Referee: Andy Penn

12 February	Ipswich Town	–	Cardiff City	Ipswich
15:00 GMT				Stadium: Portman Road

16 February 30	Cardiff City	1–1	West Bromwich Albion	Cardiff
19:45 GMT	Whittingham 8' (pen.)	report	45+4' Zuiverloon	Stadium: Cardiff City Stadium; Attendance: 20,758; Referee: Andy Woolmer

20 February 31	Cardiff City	0–2	Barnsley	Cardiff
15:00 GMT		report	9', 12' Bogdanovic	Stadium: Cardiff City Stadium; Attendance: 19,753; Referee: Keith Stroud

27 February 32	Preston North End	3–0	Cardiff City	Preston
15:00 GMT	Parkin 30' (pen.), 54'; Coutts (red card) 52'; Brown 86'	report		Stadium: Deepdale; Attendance: 11,777; Referee: Andy Hall

6 March 33	Cardiff City	1–0	Middlesbrough	Cardiff
15:00 GMT	Bothroyd 3'	report		Stadium: Cardiff City Stadium; Attendance: 19,803; Referee: Darren Deadman

9 March 34	Ipswich Town	2–0	Cardiff City	Ipswich
19:45 GMT	Murphy 18', 58'	report		Stadium: Portman Road; Attendance: 19,997; Referee: Grant Hegley

13 March 35	Leicester City	1–0	Cardiff City	Leicester
15:00 GMT	Waghorn 29'	report		Stadium: Walkers Stadium; Attendance: 22,767; Referee: Karl Evans

16 March 36	Coventry City	1–2	Cardiff City	Coventry
19:45 GMT	Morrison 32'	report	41' Burke; 90+2' (pen.) Whittingham	Stadium: Ricoh Arena; Attendance: 16,038; Referee: Simon Hooper

21 March 37	Cardiff City	3–1	Watford	Cardiff
15:00 GMT	McCormack 7'; Whittingham 63'; Burke 78'	report	90+3' Helguson	Stadium: Cardiff City Stadium; Attendance: 20,130; Referee: Phil Crossley

24 March 38	Cardiff City	1–1	Sheffield United	Cardiff
19:45 GMT	Bothroyd 45'	report	67' Quinn	Stadium: Cardiff City Stadium; Attendance: 18,715; Referee: Danny McDermid

27 March 39	Crystal Palace	1–2	Cardiff City	London
12:45 GMT	Hill 58'	report	4' Gyepes; 67' Burke	Stadium: Selhurst Park; Attendance: 13,464; Referee: Carl Boyeson

30 March 40	Cardiff City	2–1	Leicester City	Cardiff
19:45 BST	McCormack 10'; Whittingham 45'; (red card) 71' Gyepes	report	52' Howard	Stadium: Cardiff City Stadium; Attendance: 20,438; Referee: Fred Graham

3 April 41	Cardiff City	2–1	Swansea City	Cardiff
17:20 BST	Chopra 42', 90+2'	report	28' Orlandi	Stadium: Cardiff City Stadium; Attendance: 25,130; Referee: Phil Dowd

5 April 42	Nottingham Forest	0–0	Cardiff City	Nottingham
17:15 BST		report		Stadium: City Ground; Attendance: 22,185; Referee: Chris Foy

10 April 43	Cardiff City	0–0	Reading	Cardiff
15:00 BST		report		Stadium: Cardiff City Stadium; Attendance: 21,248; Referee: Anthony Bates

17 April 44	Queens Park Rangers	1–0	Cardiff City	London
15:00 BST		report	80' Ledley	Stadium: Loftus Road; Attendance: 12,832; Referee: Michael Oliver

24 April 45	Cardiff City	3–2	Sheffield Wednesday	Cardiff
15:00 BST	Whittingham 17'; Bothroyd 54', 81'	report	15' Johnson; 78' Tudgay	Stadium: Cardiff City Stadium; Attendance: 23,304; Referee: Anthony Taylor

2 May 46	Derby County	2–0	Cardiff City	Derby
13:00 BST	McEveley 48'; Martin 62'	report		Stadium: Pride Park Stadium; Attendance: 31,102; Referee: Colin Webster

=== Play-offs ===
9 May Semi-final (1st leg)	Leicester City	0–1	Cardiff City	Leicester
13:45 BST		report	78' Whittingham	Stadium: Walkers Stadium; Attendance: 29,165; Referee: Alan Wiley

12 May Semi-final (2nd leg)	Cardiff City	2–3 (a.e.t.) (3–3 agg.) (4–3 p)	Leicester City	Cardiff
19:45 BST	Chopra 21'; Whittingham 69' (pen.)	report	25' Fryatt; 36' (o.g.) Hudson; 49' King	Stadium: Cardiff City Stadium; Attendance: 26,033; Referee: Howard Webb
	Penalties
	Chopra (penalty scored); McCormack (penalty scored); Ledley (penalty scored); Kennedy (penalty scored)		(penalty scored) Berner; (penalty scored) Howard; (penalty scored) Solano; (penalty missed) Kermorgant; (penalty missed) Waghorn

22 May Final	Blackpool	3–2	Cardiff City	London
15:00 BST	Adam 13'; Taylor-Fletcher 41'; Ormerod 45+1'	report	9' Chopra; 37' Ledley	Stadium: Wembley Stadium; Attendance: 82,244; Referee: Andre Marriner

=== FA Cup ===
12 January Third round	Bristol City	1–1	Cardiff City	Bristol
19:45 GMT	Williams 90+2'	report	76' Chopra	Stadium: Ashton Gate; Attendance: 7,289; Referee: Peter Walton

19 January Third round replay	Cardiff City	1–0	Bristol City	Cardiff
19:45 GMT	Orr 74' (o.g.)	report		Stadium: Cardiff City Stadium; Attendance: 6,731; Referee: Nigel Miller

23 January Fourth round	Cardiff City	4–2	Leicester City	Cardiff
15:00 GMT	Bothroyd 17'; Whittingham 71'; Burke 90+2'; McCormack 90+4'	report	34' Morrison; 39' N'Guessan	Stadium: Cardiff City Stadium; Attendance: 10,961; Referee: Phil Crossley

13 February Fifth round	Chelsea	4–1	Cardiff City	London
12:00 GMT	Drogba 2'; Ballack 51'; Sturridge 69'; Kalou 86'	report	34' Chopra	Stadium: Stamford Bridge; Attendance: 40,827; Referee: Andre Marriner

=== Football League Cup ===
11 August First round	Cardiff City	3–1	Dagenham & Redbridge	Cardiff
19:45 BST	Rae 20'; Bothroyd 26' (pen.); Whittingham 90+1'	report	81' Scott	Stadium: Cardiff City Stadium; Attendance: 5,545; Referee: Andy Penn

26 August Second round	Cardiff City	3–1	Bristol Rovers	Cardiff
19:45 BST	Chopra 33'; Whittingham 66'; Magennis 86'	report	75' Elliott	Stadium: Cardiff City Stadium; Attendance: 9,767; Referee: Roger East

23 September Third round	Aston Villa	1–0	Cardiff City	Birmingham
19:45 BST	Agbonlahor 3'	report		Stadium: Villa Park; Attendance: 22,527; Referee: Anthony Taylor

== Overall summary ==
=== Summary ===
Games Played	56 (46 Championship, 3 Play-Offs, 4 FA Cup, 3 League Cup
Games Won	28 (23 Championship, 1 Play-Offs, 2 FA Cup, 2 League Cup)
Games Drawn	11 (10 Championship, 0 Play-Offs, 1 FA Cup, 0 League Cup)
Games Lost	18 (14 Championship, 2 Play-Offs, 1 FA Cup, 1 League Cup)
Goals Scored	91 (73 Championship, 5 Play-Offs, 7 FA Cup, 6 League Cup)
Goals conceded	70 (54 Championship, 6 Play-Offs, 7 FA Cup, 3 League Cup)
Goal Difference	+21
Clean Sheets	16 (14 Championship, 1 Play-Offs, 1 FA Cup, 0 League Cup)
Yellow Cards	76 (63 Championship, 6 Play-Offs, 5 FA Cup, 2 League Cup)
Red Cards	4 (4 Championship, 0 Play-Offs, 0 FA Cup, 0 League Cup)
Worst Discipline	(England) Jay Bothroyd (13 (yellow card) , 0 (red card) )
Best Result	6–0 vs Bristol City
Worst Result	1–5 vs Newcastle United
Most Appearances	(Scotland) Chris Burke 52 (44 Championship, 3 Play-Offs, 3 FA Cup, 2 League Cup)
Top Scorer	(England) Peter Whittingham 25 (20 Championship, 2 Play-Offs, 1 FA Cup, 2 League Cup)
Points	76 / 138 (55.88%)

=== Aggregate Scores ===
Opposition	Home Score	Away Score	Double
Barnsley	0–2	0–1	No
Blackpool	1–1	1–1	No
Bristol City	3–0	6–0	Yes
Coventry City	2–0	2–1	Yes
Crystal Palace	1–1	2–1	No
Derby County	6–1	0–2	No
Doncaster Rovers	2–1	0–2	No
Ipswich Town	1–2	0–2	No
Leicester City	2–1	0–1	No
Middlesbrough	1–0	1–0	Yes
Newcastle United	0–1	1–5	No
Nottingham Forest	1–1	0–0	No
Peterborough United	2–0	4–4	No
Plymouth Argyle	0–1	3–1	No
Preston North End	1–0	0–3	No
Queens Park Rangers	0–2	1–0	No
Reading	0–0	1–0	No
Scunthorpe United	4–0	1–1	No
Sheffield United	1–1	4–3	No
Sheffield Wednesday	3–2	1–3	No
Swansea City	2–1	2–3	No
Watford	3–1	4–0	Yes
West Bromwich Albion	1–1	2–0	No

== Backroom staff ==
Position	Name
Manager	Dave Jones
Assistant manager	Terry Burton
Reserve team manager	Paul Wilkinson
Club doctor	Dr Leonard Noakes
Club physio	Sean Connelly
Fitness coach	Alex Armstrong
Goalkeeping coach	Martyn Margetson
Kit manager	Ian Lanning
Performance analyst	Enda Barron
Masseur	Steffan Burnett
Academy manager	Neal Ardley

== Awards ==
=== Team ===
- Football League Championship Play-Offs: Runners-Up

=== Individual ===
- October Championship manager of the month: Dave Jones
- October Championship player of the month: Peter Whittingham
- Football League Championship Apprentice of the Year: Adam Matthews
- PFA Team of the Year: Peter Whittingham, Michael Chopra
- Football League Championship top-goalscorer: Peter Whittingham (20 goals) (joint with Bristol City's Nicky Maynard)

== See also ==
- Cardiff City F.C. seasons
- 2009–10 Football League Championship
- 2009–10 FA Cup
- 2009–10 Football League Cup
