= Solomon Taiwo =

Nigerian footballer (born 1985)

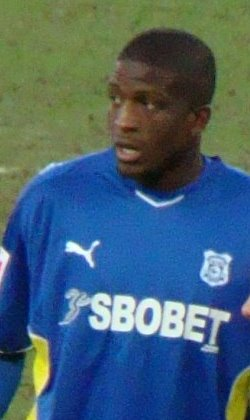
- Taiwo playing for Cardiff City in 2010

Personal information
- Full name: Solomon Oladiran Taiwo
- Date of birth: 29 April 1985 (age 41)
- Place of birth: Lagos, Nigeria
- Height: 6 ft 0 in (1.83 m)
- Position: Midfielder

Team information
- Current team: Bishop's Stortford

Youth career
- 2002: Millwall

Senior career*
Years	Team	Apps	(Gls)
2004	Bromley	30	(11)
2004	Maidenhead United		
2005	Fort Wayne Fever	11	(0)
2005	Tooting & Mitcham United		
2005	Weymouth		
2005	Chesham United		
2005	Windsor & Eton		
2006	Bromley		
2007	Sutton United		
2007	→ Dagenham & Redbridge (loan)	3	(0)
2007–2009	Dagenham & Redbridge	51	(4)
2009–2012	Cardiff City	9	(0)
2010–2011	→ Dagenham & Redbridge (loan)	18	(0)
2012	→ Leyton Orient (loan)	5	(0)
2012	Mansfield Town	1	(0)
2012–2013	Bromley	7	(0)
2013–2015	Luton Town	14	(2)
2014	→ Aldershot Town (loan)	6	(0)
2014	→ Dover Athletic (loan)	13	(0)
2015	Dover Athletic	23	(0)
2015–2016	Margate	13	(2)
2016–2017	Cray Wanderers	27	(2)
2017–2018	Bishop's Stortford	6	(0)
2019–	Faversham Town	6	(1)
- * Club domestic league appearances and goals as of 6 April 2017 (UTC)

Solomon Oladiran Taiwo (born 29 April 1985) is a Nigerian footballer who plays for Faversham Town. He previously played for a number of clubs at Conference South level and below before joining League Two side Dagenham & Redbridge in 2007. He signed for Championship team Cardiff City in 2009, though he was restricted to only a few appearances and left the club in June 2012.

== Personal life ==
Born in Lagos, Nigeria, Taiwo moved to London with his family when he was eighteen months old.

== Career ==
=== Early career ===
Taiwo began his career as a YTS trainee at Millwall but was unable to break into the first team and was released in the summer of 2004. He joined Bromley and had short spells with Maidenhead United, Fort Wayne Fever in the US, Tooting & Mitcham United, Weymouth, Chesham United, and Windsor & Eton. He joined Conference South side Sutton United in March 2007 after a second term with Bromley.

=== Dagenham & Redbridge ===
In October 2007, Taiwo joined League Two side Dagenham & Redbridge on an initial one-month loan deal from Sutton United, making his debut in a 1–0 win over Leyton Orient in the Football League Trophy. He signed a two-year contract with Dagenham in November 2007. At the end of the 2008–09 season, Taiwo was voted the club's player of the year after the side reached a then-highest finish of eighth in the league.

=== Cardiff City ===
On 25 August 2009 he signed a three-year deal with Championship side Cardiff City for a fee of up to £250,000, depending on appearances and promotion. Described by Cardiff manager Dave Jones as "a good prospect, a strong player, a good athlete and comfortable on the ball", Taiwo had played against the side two weeks earlier in the first round of the Football League Cup. He made his Cardiff debut in a 2–0 defeat to Doncaster Rovers at the Keepmoat Stadium as a substitute in place of Peter Whittingham. He made his first start and his home debut against Queens Park Rangers. He played his first South Wales Derby on 7 November 2009 in a 3–2 loss, coming on for Tony Capaldi. On 12 January, during a post match interview against Bristol City, Dave Jones stated that they had agreed a deal with Colchester United for Taiwo to join them on loan, but the move was later cancelled due to an ongoing midfield injury crisis at Cardiff. On 31 May 2010, Taiwo was set to sign for Championship rivals Norwich City, for a fee of £150,000, however the move later collapsed after he failed a medical.

On 29 October, Dagenham boss John Still confirmed that Taiwo would be re-joining the Daggers on loan until the end of the season. He made his return at home to Hartlepool United, with the match ending in a 1–1 draw.

After returning to Cardiff, Malky Mackay was put in place, and after not making an appearance the previous season for the Bluebirds, Taiwo made his first appearance in a year for Cardiff in the League Cup against Oxford United, only to be taken off after 15 minutes with an ankle injury. His first league appearance of the season came in a 2–1 win over Southampton coming on for an injured Filip Kiss. After only two appearances for the Bluebirds, Taiwo's agent, Simon Dent, confirmed he had inquiries from two unnamed League One clubs for a short-term loan. Taiwo then joined League One side Chesterfield on 29 December on trial with potential for a loan move, but he elected to join Leyton Orient on loan for the remainder of the season instead on 24 January 2012.

=== Release from Cardiff ===
Taiwo was not offered a new contract by Cardiff and left the club in June 2012. Taiwo was signed by Conference Premier side Mansfield Town on 6 October 2012. He made one appearance before leaving the club. Following his departure, he re-signed for Bromley, his third spell at the club. He made his return on 8 December in a home league defeat against Farnborough, going on to play in five further league games before leaving the club in February 2013.

=== Luton Town ===
On 7 March 2013 Taiwo was reunited with his former Dagenham & Redbridge manager John Still, now in charge of Conference Premier side Luton Town, who brought him to Kenilworth Road on a short-term contract. Taiwo signed a one-year extension to his contract in May 2013.

On 31 January 2014, Taiwo completed a one-month loan move to Aldershot Town. He returned to Luton after playing six times for the Shots. Luton won the Conference Premier title during the 2013–14 season, with Taiwo having played in five league games, scoring once. Taiwo was placed on the transfer list by Luton at the end of the campaign. In September 2014 Taiwo was loaned to Conference Premier side Dover Athletic initially for a month, but later extended. Taiwo was released from his Luton contract in January 2015 and then joined Dover on a permanent basis.

=== Cooking ===
In 2017, Taiwo competed on MasterChef UK but was eliminated at the first round.

=== Cray Wanderers ===
After appearing for a number of non-league clubs, including Dover and Margate, Taiwo signed for Cray Wanderers of the Isthmian League South Division for the 2016–17 season. He was regular member of the team, before being released in February 2017.

== Career statistics ==
As of match played 25 April 2015.

Club statistics
Club	Season	League		FA Cup		League Cup		Other		Total	
Club	Season	App	Goals	App	Goals	App	Goals	App	Goals	App	Goals
Dagenham & Redbridge	2007–08	10	0	0	0	0	0	2	0	12	0
Dagenham & Redbridge	2008–09	40	4	3	1	1	1	2	0	46	6
Dagenham & Redbridge	2009–10	4	0	0	0	1	0	0	0	5	0
Dagenham & Redbridge	Total	54	4	3	1	2	1	4	0	63	6
Cardiff City	2009–10	8	0	2	0	0	0	0	0	10	0
Cardiff City	2010–11	0	0	0	0	0	0	0	0	0	0
Cardiff City	2011–12	1	0	0	0	1	0	0	0	2	0
Cardiff City	Total	9	0	2	0	1	0	0	0	12	0
Dagenham & Redbridge (loan)	2010–11	18	0	2	1	0	0	0	0	20	1
Leyton Orient (loan)	2011–12	5	0	0	0	0	0	0	0	5	0
Mansfield Town	2012–13	1	0	0	0	—		0	0	1	0
Bromley	2012–13	6	0	0	0	—		2	0	8	0
Luton Town	2012–13	9	1	0	0	—		0	0	9	1
Luton Town	2013–14	5	1	0	0	—		2	0	7	1
Luton Town	Total	14	2	0	0	—		2	0	16	2
Aldershot Town (loan)	2013–14	6	0	0	0	—		0	0	6	0
Dover Athletic (loan)	2014–15	13	0	1	0	—		0	0	14	0
Dover Athletic (loan)	2014–15	10	0	0	0	—		0	0	10	0
Dover Athletic (loan)	Total	23	0	1	0	—		0	0	24	0
Career total		131	6	8	2	3	1	7	0	148	9

== Honours ==
Luton Town

- Conference Premier: 2013–14
