= High Point, Bradford =

Commercial building in West Yorkshire, England

High Point
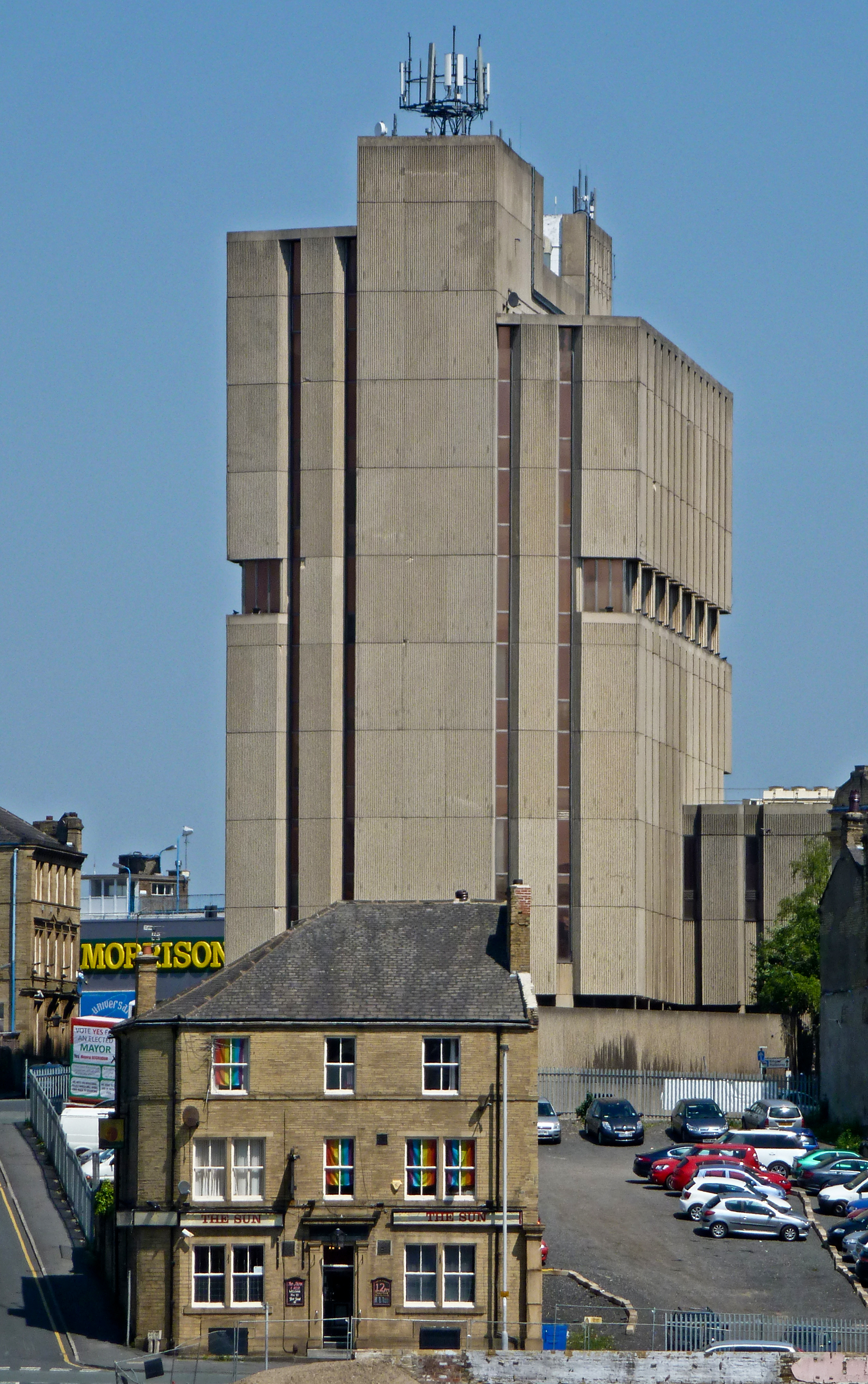
- High Point in May 2012

General information
- Status: Extant
- Type: Bank headquarters
- Architectural style: Brutalist
- Location: Providence Street, Bradford, Bradford, West Yorkshire, England
- Coordinates: 53°47′44″N 01°45′31″W
- Completed: 1972
- Client: Bradford Permanent Building Society

Design and construction
- Architecture firm: John Brunton Partnership

High Point is a high rise former commercial building in Bradford, in West Yorkshire, England. It is a prominent example of Brutalist architecture. Designed by John Brunton Partnership of Bradford, it was completed in 1972 to serve as the headquarters of the Bradford Permanent Building Society. The building went unused for a quarter of a century, before being converted to 87 flats in 2024.

== History ==
High Point was built as the headquarters of the Bradford Permanent Building Society and completed in 1972. High Point was one of a trifecta of headquarters of building societies built in the brutalist style at the time of its construction in Northern England. The other two were the headquarters of the Halifax Building Society designed by the Building Design Partnership in Halifax and the head offices of Bradford & Bingley Building Society in Bingley designed by JBP.

The building had become unused for several decades prior to the 2010s. An informal panel discussion on High Point in March 2018 included participants from the Bradford Civic Society, the Director of the Twentieth Century Society, Catherine Croft, and the architectural critic and historian Simon Jenkins. The non-binding discussion ended with a resolution to seek a new use for the building. Croft said that buildings such as High Point demonstrate "how cities have evolved" and that by "trying to erase the legacy of brutalism you are simplifying the history of a city". Jenkins felt that the Brutalist style of Highpoint was "F-you architecture" intended as a political statement by its architects as opposed to an aesthetic that they themselves would personally utilise. 78% of respondents to a 2018 poll run by a local newspaper, the Telegraph & Argus said that High Point should be demolished.

An illegal rave attracted 500 revellers to the High Point in March 2010 before it was broken up by police.

Under the rebranded name Radii, the building underwent a residential conversion comprising 87 "affordable, luxury" flats, opening in 2024. The scheme had been boosted by a £2.9m Bradford Heritage Buildings grant which was essential to the deliverability of the scheme according to the developer Adam Sims.

In 2026, The Telegraph named High Point as Britain's top brutalist building, alongside other brutalist buildings such as The Barbican, London and Preston Bus Station, Preston.

== Design ==
High Point is a prominent example of Brutalist architecture. It was designed by the John Brunton Partnership of Bradford. It is 8 storeys in height and is noted for its use of ribbed concrete. George Sheeran, writing in Bradford in 50 Buildings, describes the "long narrow windows, like arrow slits, giving the appearance of a castle keep" unconsciously implying the surety of the Yorkshire Building Society's loans and investments. The extreme height of the building in comparison to its neighbours can cause excessive wind turbulence. In his A Guide to the New Ruins of Great Britain, Owen Hatherley describes High Point as "utterly freakish, the severed head of some Japanese giant robot clad in a West Yorkshire stone aggregate".

The Twentieth Century Society described the three buildings as representing in retrospect "the last-gasp of a sort of Heath-Wilsonian regional resurgence, at a time when "financial services" were not synonymous with the corporate casino-ism of the City of London, but a flourishing of century-old Victorian independent mutuals, and northern self-sufficiency". High Point was included in Brutal North: Post-War Modernist Architecture in the North of England, Simon Phipps's photographic study of Brutalist architecture.

=== Gallery ===
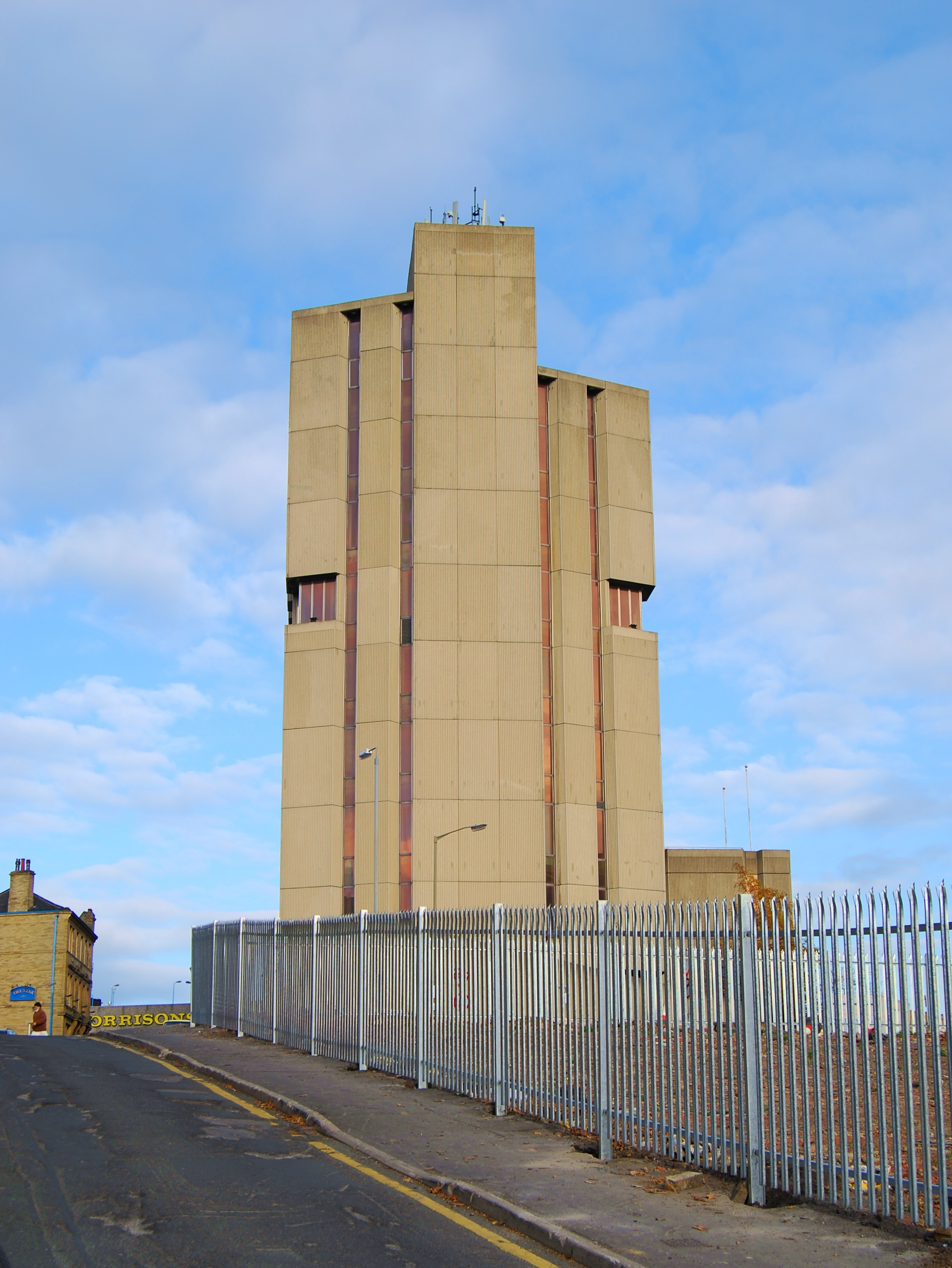
High Point in November 2007

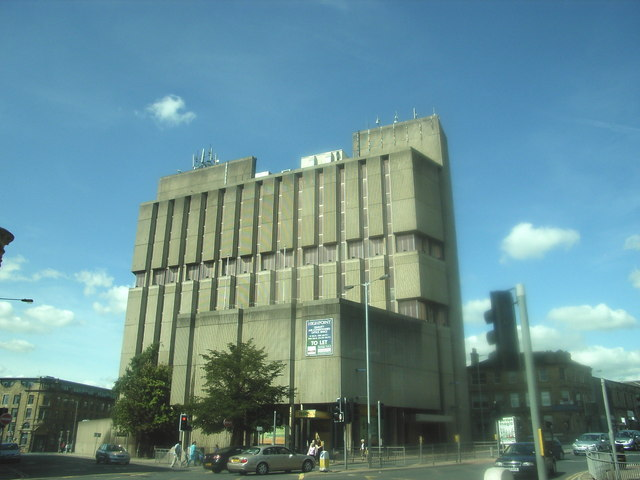
High Point from street level in August 2009

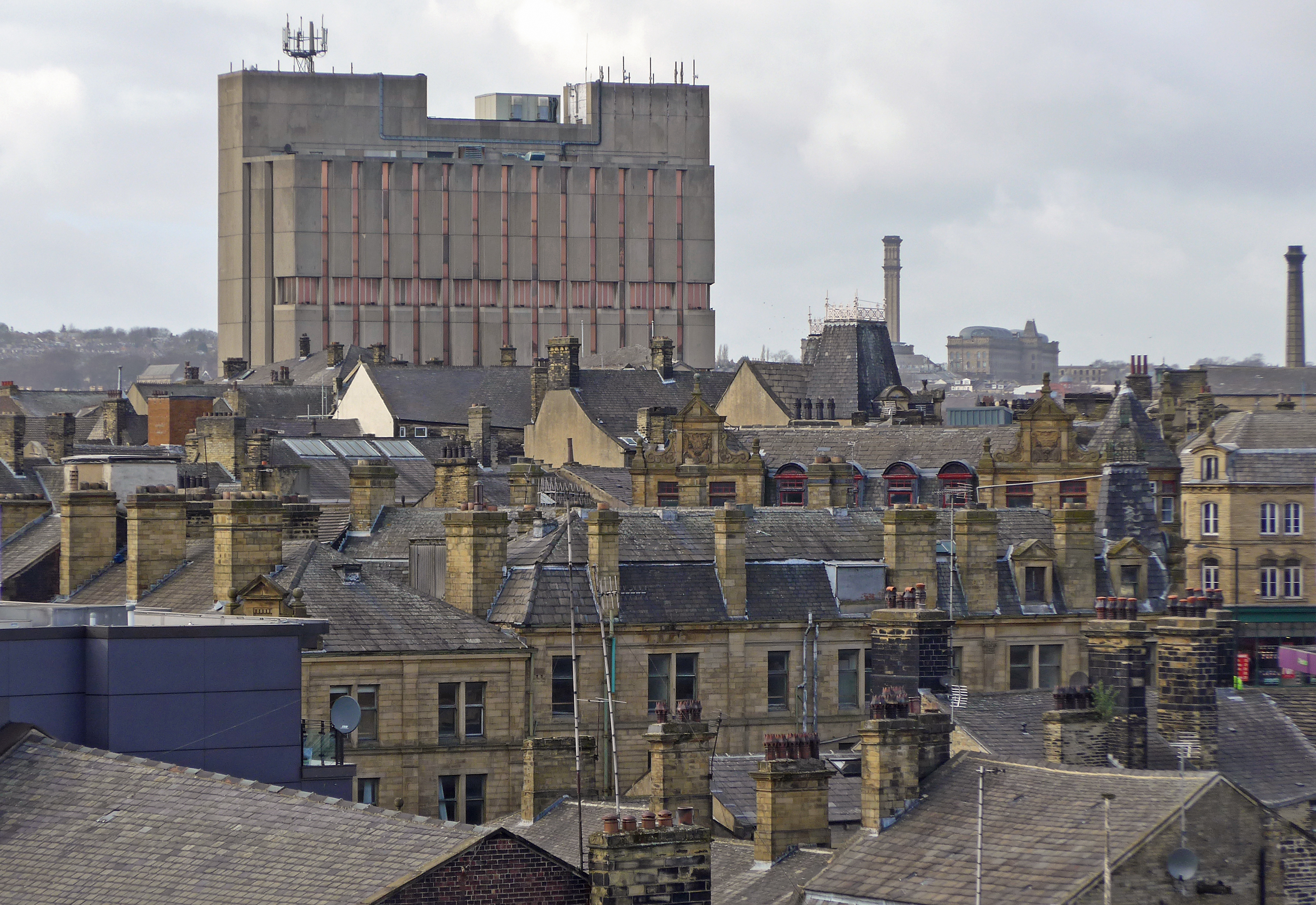
A distant view of High Point in March 2015

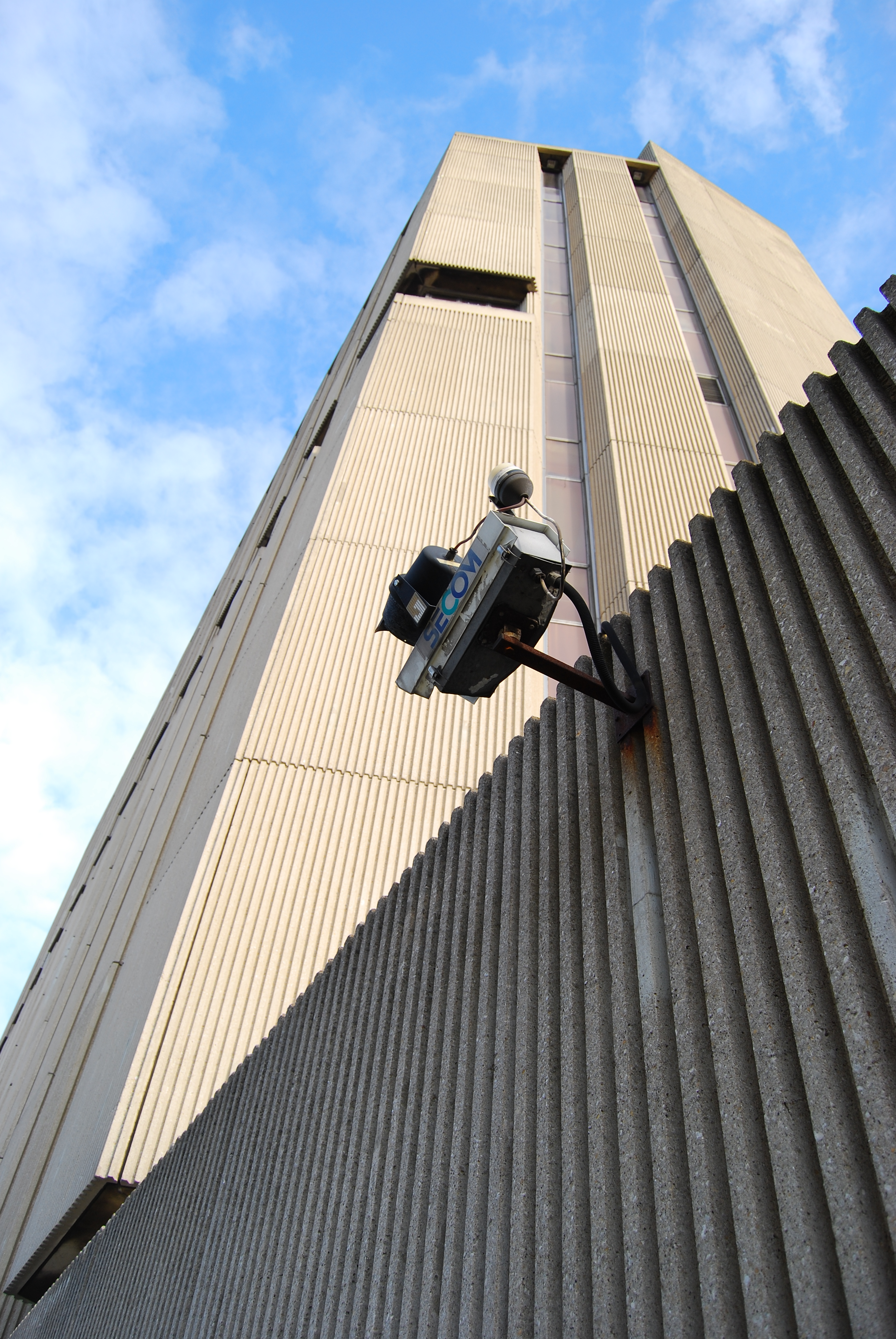
Detail of the tower of High Point
