= 2006–07 Football League Championship =

Football League Championship
- Season: 2006–07
- Champions: Sunderland; 2nd Championship title 5th 2nd tier title
- Direct promotion to Premier League: Sunderland; Birmingham City
- Promoted to Premier League through play-offs: Derby County
- Relegated: Leeds United; Luton Town; Southend United
- Matches: 552
- Goals: 1,439 (2.61 per match)
- Top goalscorer: Jamie Cureton (Colchester United), 23

The 2006–07 Football League Championship (known as the Coca-Cola Championship for sponsorship reasons) was the third season of the league under its current title and fifteenth season under its current league division format.

The Football League is contested through three Divisions. The top divisions of these is the League Championship. The winner and the runner-up of the League Championship are automatically promoted to the Premiership and they are joined by the winner of the League Championship play-off. The bottom three teams in the Championship are relegated to the second division, League One.

Sunderland finished top of the league with 88 points, closely followed by Birmingham City who had 86 points. Derby County were promoted through the play-offs. Southend United, Luton Town and Leeds United were relegated.

== Changes from last season ==
=== From Championship ===
Promoted to Premier League

- Reading (1st)
- Sheffield United (2nd)
- Watford (3rd Play-offs)

Relegated to League One

- Crewe Alexandra (22nd)
- Millwall (23rd)
- Brighton & Hove Albion (24th)

=== To Championship ===
Relegated from Premier League

- Birmingham City (18th)
- West Bromwich Albion (19th)
- Sunderland (20th)

Promoted from League One

- Southend United (1st)
- Colchester United (2nd)
- Barnsley (3rd Play-offs)

== Teams ==
=== Stadia and locations ===
Locations of teams in the 2006–07 Football League Championship

Team	Location	Stadium	Capacity
Barnsley	Barnsley	Oakwell	23,009
Birmingham City	Birmingham	St Andrew's Stadium	30,009
Burnley	Burnley	Turf Moor	22,546
Cardiff City	Cardiff	Ninian Park	22,008
Colchester United	Colchester	Layer Road	6,320
Coventry City	Coventry	Ricoh Arena	32,609
Crystal Palace	London (Croydon)	Selhurst Park	26,309
Derby County	Derby	Pride Park Stadium	33,597
Hull City	Kingston upon Hull	KC Stadium	25,586
Ipswich Town	Ipswich	Portman Road	30,311
Leeds United	Leeds	Elland Road	37,792
Leicester City	Leicester	Walkers Stadium	32,261
Luton Town	Luton	Kenilworth Road	10,356
Norwich City	Norwich	Carrow Road	26,034
Plymouth Argyle	Plymouth	Home Park	19,500
Preston North End	Preston	Deepdale	24,500
Queens Park Rangers	London (White City)	Loftus Road	19,128
Southend United	Southend-on-Sea	Roots Hall	12,392
Sheffield Wednesday	Sheffield	Hillsborough	39,814
Southampton	Southampton	St Mary's Stadium	32,689
Stoke City	Stoke-on-Trent	Brittania Stadium	27,500
Sunderland	Sunderland	Stadium of Light	49,000
West Bromwich Albion	West Bromwich	The Hawthorns	26,688
Wolverhampton Wanderers	Wolverhampton	Molineux	28,525

=== Personnel and sponsoring ===
Team	Manager	Kit maker	Main sponsor
Barnsley	(Wales) Simon Davey	Jako	Barnsley Building Society
Birmingham City	(England) Steve Bruce	Lonsdale	flybe.com
Burnley	(England) Steve Cotterill	Erreà	Hunters Estate Agents
Cardiff City	(England) Dave Jones	Joma	Communications Direct
Colchester United	(Wales) Geraint Williams	Diadora	MutualPoints.com (H) / Smart Energy (A)
Coventry City	(England) Iain Dowie	Puma	Cassidy Group
Crystal Palace	(England) Peter Taylor	Diadora	GAC Logistics
Derby County	(Scotland) Billy Davies	Joma	The Derbyshire
Hull City	(England) Phil Brown	Diadora	Bonus Electrical
Ipswich Town	(Northern Ireland) Jim Magilton	Punch	E.ON
Leeds United	(England) Dennis Wise	Admiral	Bet24
Leicester City	(Northern Ireland) Nigel Worthington	JJB	Alliance & Leicester
Luton Town	(England) Kevin Blackwell	Diadora	Electrolux
Norwich City	(Scotland) Peter Grant	Xara	flybe.com
Plymouth Argyle	(England) Ian Holloway	Puma	Ginsters
Preston North End	(England) Paul Simpson	Diadora	Enterprise plc
Queens Park Rangers	(England) John Gregory	Le Coq Sportif	Cargiant
Southend United	(England) Steve Tilson	Nike	InsureandGo
Sheffield Wednesday	(England) Brian Laws	Diadora	Plusnet
Southampton	(Scotland) George Burley	Saints	flybe.com
Stoke City	(Wales) Tony Pulis	Puma	Britannia Building Society
Sunderland	(Republic of Ireland) Roy Keane	Lonsdale	Reg Vardy
West Bromwich Albion	(England) Tony Mowbray	Umbro	T-Mobile
Wolverhampton Wanderers	(Republic of Ireland) Mick McCarthy	Le Coq Sportif	Chaucer Consulting

== League table ==
Pos	Team	Pld	W	D	L	GF	GA	GD	Pts	Promotion, qualification or relegation
1	Sunderland (C, P)	46	27	7	12	76	47	+29	88	Promotion to the Premier League
2	Birmingham City (P)	46	26	8	12	67	42	+25	86	Promotion to the Premier League
3	Derby County (O, P)	46	25	9	12	62	46	+16	84	Qualification for Championship play-offs
4	West Bromwich Albion	46	22	10	14	81	55	+26	76	Qualification for Championship play-offs
5	Wolverhampton Wanderers	46	22	10	14	59	56	+3	76	Qualification for Championship play-offs
6	Southampton	46	21	12	13	77	53	+24	75	Qualification for Championship play-offs
7	Preston North End	46	22	8	16	64	53	+11	74	
8	Stoke City	46	19	16	11	62	41	+21	73	
9	Sheffield Wednesday	46	20	11	15	70	66	+4	71	
10	Colchester United	46	20	9	17	70	56	+14	69	
11	Plymouth Argyle	46	17	16	13	63	62	+1	67	
12	Crystal Palace	46	18	11	17	59	51	+8	65	
13	Cardiff City	46	17	13	16	57	53	+4	64	
14	Ipswich Town	46	18	8	20	64	59	+5	62	
15	Burnley	46	15	12	19	52	49	+3	57	
16	Norwich City	46	16	9	21	56	71	−15	57	
17	Coventry City	46	16	8	22	47	62	−15	56	
18	Queens Park Rangers	46	14	11	21	54	68	−14	53	
19	Leicester City	46	13	14	19	49	64	−15	53	
20	Barnsley	46	15	5	26	53	85	−32	50	
21	Hull City	46	13	10	23	51	67	−16	49	
22	Southend United (R)	46	10	12	24	47	80	−33	42	Relegation to Football League One
23	Luton Town (R)	46	10	10	26	53	81	−28	40	Relegation to Football League One
24	Leeds United (R)	46	13	7	26	46	72	−26	36 (Note: Leeds United had 10 points deducted for entering financial administration.)	Relegation to Football League One

Source: RSSSF
Rules for classification: In the Football League goals scored (F) takes precedence over goal difference (GD).
(C) Champions; (O) Play-off winners; (P) Promoted; (R) Relegated

== Results ==
Home \ Away	BAR	BIR	BUR	CAR	COL	COV	CRY	DER	HUL	IPS	LEE	LEI	LUT	NWC	PLY	PNE	QPR	SHW	SOU	SEU	STK	SUN	WBA	WOL
Barnsley		1–0	1–0	1–2	0–3	0–1	2–0	1–2	3–0	1–0	3–2	0–1	1–2	1–3	2–2	0–1	2–0	0–3	2–2	2–0	2–2	0–2	1–1	1–0
Birmingham City	2–0		0–1	1–0	2–1	3–0	2–1	1–0	2–1	2–2	1–0	1–1	2–2	0–1	3–0	3–1	2–1	2–0	2–1	1–3	1–0	1–1	2–0	1–1
Burnley	4–2	1–2		2–0	1–2	1–2	1–1	0–0	2–0	1–0	2–1	0–1	0–0	3–0	4–0	3–2	2–0	1–1	2–3	0–0	0–1	2–2	3–2	0–1
Cardiff City	2–0	2–0	1–0		0–0	1–0	0–0	2–2	0–1	2–2	1–0	3–2	4–1	1–0	2–2	4–1	0–1	1–2	1–0	0–1	1–1	0–1	1–1	4–0
Colchester United	1–2	1–1	0–0	3–1		0–0	0–2	4–3	5–1	1–0	2–1	1–1	4–1	3–0	0–1	1–0	2–1	4–0	2–0	3–0	3–0	3–1	1–2	2–1
Coventry City	4–1	0–1	1–0	2–2	2–1		2–4	1–2	2–0	1–2	1–0	0–0	1–0	3–0	0–1	0–4	0–1	3–1	2–1	1–1	0–0	2–1	0–1	2–1
Crystal Palace	2–0	0–1	2–2	1–2	1–3	1–0		2–0	1–1	2–0	1–0	2–0	2–1	3–1	0–1	3–0	3–0	1–2	0–2	3–1	0–1	1–0	0–2	2–2
Derby County	2–1	0–1	1–0	3–1	5–1	1–1	1–0		2–2	2–1	2–0	1–0	1–0	0–0	1–0	1–1	1–1	1–0	2–2	3–0	0–2	1–2	2–1	0–2
Hull City	2–3	2–0	2–0	4–1	1–1	0–1	1–1	1–2		2–5	1–2	1–2	0–0	1–2	1–2	2–0	2–1	2–1	2–4	4–0	0–2	0–1	0–1	2–0
Ipswich Town	5–1	1–0	1–1	3–1	3–2	2–1	1–2	2–1	0–0		1–0	0–2	5–0	3–1	3–0	2–3	2–1	0–2	2–1	0–2	0–1	3–1	1–5	0–1
Leeds United	2–2	3–2	1–0	0–1	3–0	2–1	2–1	0–1	0–0	1–1		1–2	1–0	1–0	2–1	2–1	0–0	2–3	0–3	2–0	0–4	0–3	2–3	0–1
Leicester City	2–0	1–2	0–1	0–0	0–0	3–0	1–1	1–1	0–1	3–1	1–1		1–1	1–2	2–2	0–1	1–3	1–4	3–2	1–0	2–1	0–2	1–1	1–4
Luton Town	0–2	3–2	0–2	0–0	1–1	3–1	2–1	0–2	1–2	0–2	5–1	2–0		2–3	1–2	2–0	2–3	3–2	0–2	0–0	2–2	0–5	2–2	2–3
Norwich City	5–1	1–0	1–4	1–0	1–1	1–1	0–1	1–2	1–1	1–1	2–1	3–1	3–2		1–3	2–0	1–0	1–2	0–1	0–0	1–0	0–1	1–2	0–1
Plymouth Argyle	2–4	0–1	2–0	3–3	3–0	3–2	1–0	3–1	1–0	1–1	1–2	3–0	1–0	3–1		2–0	1–1	1–2	1–1	2–1	1–1	0–2	2–2	1–1
Preston North End	1–0	1–0	2–0	2–1	1–0	1–1	0–0	1–2	2–1	1–0	4–1	0–1	3–0	2–1	3–0		1–1	0–0	3–1	2–3	3–2	4–1	1–0	0–1
Queens Park Rangers	1–0	0–2	3–1	1–0	1–0	0–1	4–2	1–2	2–0	1–3	2–2	1–1	3–2	3–3	1–1	1–0		1–1	0–2	2–0	1–1	1–2	1–2	0–1
Sheffield Wednesday	2–1	0–3	1–1	0–0	2–0	2–1	3–2	1–2	1–2	2–0	0–1	2–1	0–1	3–2	1–1	1–3	3–2		3–3	3–2	1–1	2–4	3–1	2–2
Southampton	5–2	4–3	0–0	2–2	1–2	0–0	1–1	0–1	0–0	1–0	1–0	2–0	2–1	2–1	1–0	1–1	1–2	2–1		4–1	1–0	1–2	0–0	2–0
Southend United	1–3	0–4	1–0	0–3	1–3	2–3	0–1	0–1	2–3	1–3	1–1	2–2	1–3	3–3	1–1	0–0	5–0	0–0	2–1		1–0	3–1	3–1	0–1
Stoke City	0–1	0–0	0–1	3–0	3–1	1–0	2–1	2–0	1–1	0–0	3–1	4–2	0–0	5–0	1–1	1–1	1–0	1–2	2–1	1–1		2–1	1–0	1–1
Sunderland	2–0	0–1	3–2	1–2	3–1	2–0	0–0	2–1	2–0	1–0	2–0	1–1	2–1	1–0	2–3	0–1	2–1	1–0	1–1	4–0	2–2		2–0	2–1
West Bromwich Albion	7–0	1–1	3–0	1–0	2–1	5–0	2–3	1–0	2–0	2–0	4–2	2–0	3–2	0–1	2–1	4–2	3–3	0–1	1–1	1–1	1–3	1–2		3–0
Wolverhampton Wanderers	2–0	2–3	2–1	1–2	1–0	1–0	1–1	0–1	3–1	1–0	1–0	1–2	1–0	2–2	2–2	1–3	2–0	2–2	0–6	3–1	2–0	1–1	1–0	

Updated to match(es) played on 7 September 2020. Source:
Legend: Blue = home team win; Yellow = draw; Red = away team win.

== Top scorers ==
Rank	Player	Club	Goals
1	(England) Jamie Cureton	Colchester United	23
2	(England) Michael Chopra	Cardiff City	22
3	(Senegal) Diomansy Kamara	West Bromwich Albion	21
4	(Wales) Robert Earnshaw	Norwich City	19
5	(Scotland) Chris Iwelumo	Colchester United	18
=	(Poland) Grzegorz Rasiak	Southampton	18
7	(Scotland) Steve Howard	Derby County	16
=	(Republic of Ireland) Alan Lee	Ipswich Town	16
=	(England) Kevin Phillips	West Bromwich Albion	16
10	(England) David Nugent	Preston North End	15

== Play-offs ==
Semi-finals

Team 1	Agg.	Team 2	1st leg	2nd leg
6th Southampton	4–4 (3–4 pens)	Derby County 3rd	1–2	3–2 aet
5th Wolverhampton Wanderers	2–4	West Bromwich Albion 4th	2–3	0–1

Final

28 May 2007

Derby County	1–0	West Bromwich Albion
Pearson 61'	(Details)

Wembley Stadium, London
Attendance: 74,993
Referee: Graham Poll

== Attendances ==
No.	Club	Average	Change	Highest	Lowest
1	Sunderland	31,887	-5.9%	44,448	24,242
2	Derby County	25,945	7.4%	31,920	21,295
3	Norwich City	24,545	-1.6%	25,476	23,311
4	Sheffield Wednesday	23,638	-4.9%	29,103	18,752
5	Southampton	23,556	-0.2%	32,008	18,736
6	Leicester City	23,206	4.4%	30,457	18,677
7	Ipswich Town	22,445	-7.5%	28,355	19,337
8	Birmingham City	22,274	-18.7%	29,431	15,854
9	Leeds United	21,613	-3.3%	31,269	16,268
10	Wolverhampton Wanderers	20,968	-11.2%	28,016	16,772
11	West Bromwich Albion	20,472	-19.4%	26,606	17,417
12	Coventry City	20,342	-4.5%	27,212	16,178
13	Hull City	18,758	-5.5%	25,512	14,895
14	Crystal Palace	17,541	-9.8%	21,523	15,985
15	Stoke City	15,749	9.1%	23,017	11,626
16	Cardiff City	15,223	29.9%	20,109	11,549
17	Preston North End	14,430	-1.3%	19,603	11,601
18	Plymouth Argyle	13,012	-5.5%	17,088	9,841
19	Queens Park Rangers	12,936	-3.8%	16,741	10,811
20	Barnsley	12,733	40.8%	21,253	9,479
21	Burnley	11,956	-4.1%	15,061	9,681
22	Southend United	10,024	24.5%	11,415	7,901
23	Luton Town	8,580	-6.1%	10,260	7,441
24	Colchester United	5,466	37.7%	6,065	4,249
