= Boroughby =

Coordinates: 52.5755°N 0.2434°W

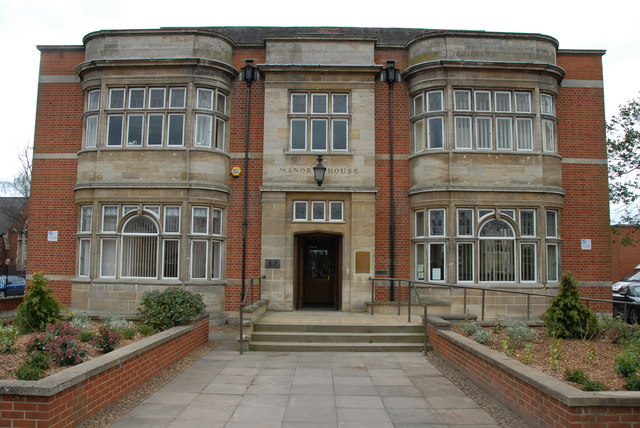
Manor House, former headquarters of the Peterborough Building Society, in 2006

Boroughby (archaically, the Manor of Boroughby and sometimes Boroughbury) is an area lying adjacent to Peterborough city centre, immediately to the north of Westgate, in the Peterborough district, in the ceremonial county of Cambridgeshire, England.

Manor House, a "building of local importance", maintains the name of Boroughbury Manor House which was demolished in 1921. The former administrative headquarters of the Peterborough Building Society, it later served as headquarters of Nene Housing Society until 2017 and has since been converted into affordable housing for local people in need. A surviving remnant of the boundary wall of part of the curtilage can be found at the south east corner of the Manor House grounds.

Monk's Tithe Barn was built at Boroughby in 1307. In 1892, the mediaeval barn was destroyed "for the sake of its materials and for the ground on which it stood."

The former Masonic Hall was constructed in 1864, possibly using materials (the limestone rubble at least) from the Boroughbury Maltings, which earlier occupied the site.

The North Westgate development is a £100 million regeneration project to deliver a new urban quarter, with a mix of offices, retail and housing in the vicinity.
