= 2009–10 Football League Championship =

Football League Championship
- Season: 2009–10
- Champions: Newcastle United; 1st Championship title 3rd 2nd tier title
- Promoted: Newcastle United; West Bromwich Albion; Blackpool
- Relegated: Sheffield Wednesday; Plymouth Argyle; Peterborough United
- Matches: 552
- Goals: 1,425 (2.58 per match)
- Top goalscorer: Peter Whittingham (22)
- Biggest home win: Reading 6–0 Peterborough
- Biggest away win: Bristol City 0–6 Cardiff City
- Highest scoring: Peterborough 4–4 Cardiff; Derby 5–3 Preston; Bristol City 5–3 Barnsley
- Longest winning run: Newcastle United (7 games, twice)
- Longest unbeaten run: Nottingham Forest (19 games)
- Longest losing run: Plymouth Argyle (7 games)
- Highest attendance: 52,381; Newcastle United 2–2 Ipswich Town
- Lowest attendance: 4,995; Scunthorpe United 4–0 Peterborough United
- Average attendance: 18,119

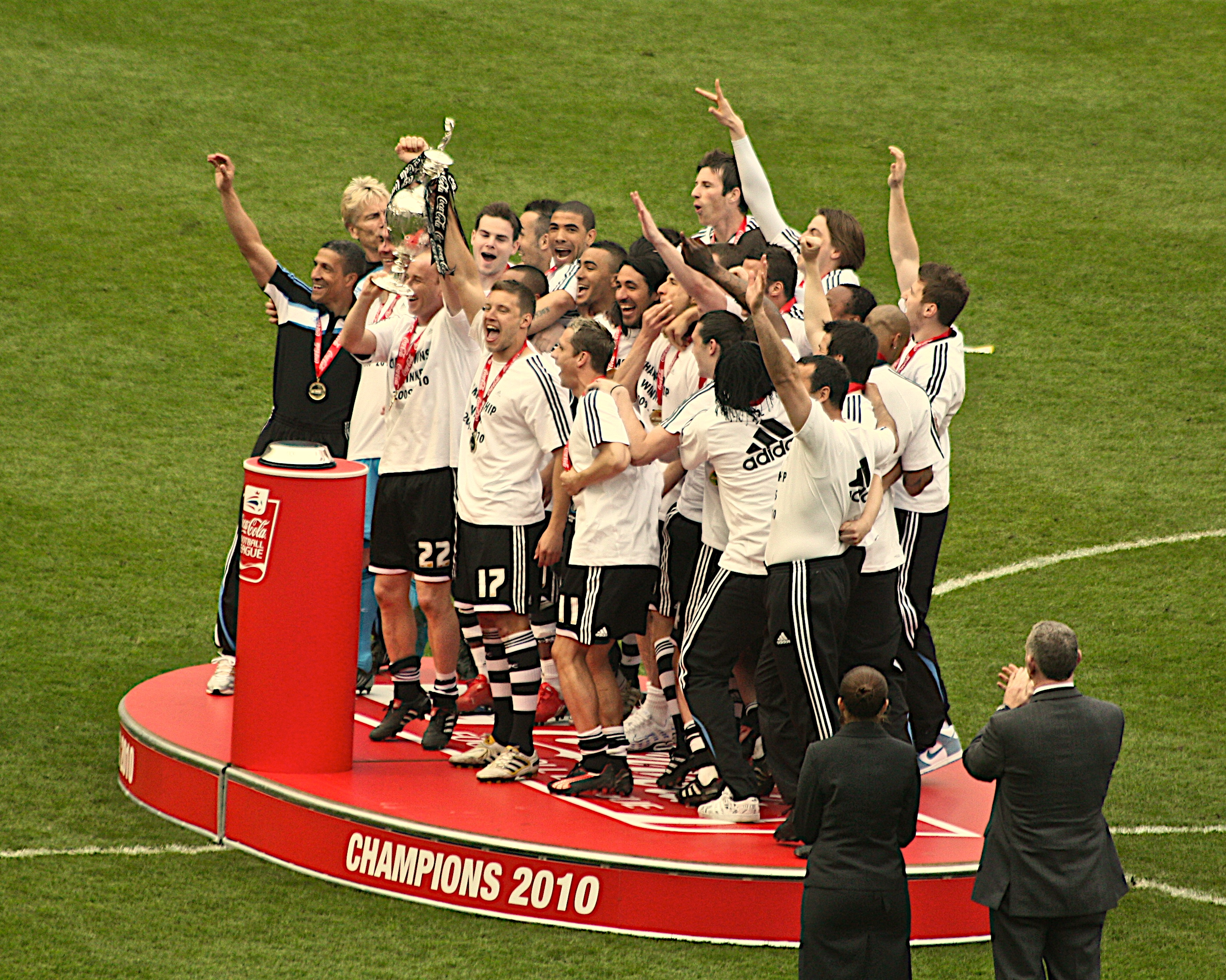
Newcastle United - Championship winners

The 2009–10 Football League Championship (known as the Coca-Cola Championship for sponsorship reasons) was the sixth season of the league under its current title and eighteenth season under its current league division format. It started on 7 August 2009.

== Changes from previous season ==
=== Team changes ===
==== From Championship ====
Promoted to Premier League

- Wolverhampton Wanderers
- Birmingham City
- Burnley

Relegated to League One

- Norwich City
- Southampton
- Charlton Athletic

==== To Championship ====
Relegated from Premier League

- Newcastle United
- Middlesbrough
- West Bromwich Albion

Promoted from League One

- Leicester City
- Peterborough United
- Scunthorpe United

=== Rule changes ===
==== On field rule changes ====
1. 'Home Grown Players' rule which aims to encourage the development of young footballers at League clubs. The new rule will require clubs to name at least four players in their matchday squad that have been registered domestically, for a minimum of three seasons, prior to their 21st birthday
2. For the first time clubs will also have the opportunity to name seven substitutes (previously five), three of which may enter the field of play (no change)

Note: "Amendments to the laws of the game 2009–2010" also applied

==== Off field rule changes ====
1. Financial regulations relating to tax payments. From now on, any club that falls behind with its employee related payments to HMRC will be subject to a transfer embargo until such time as the debt is cleared

== Team overview ==
=== Stadia and locations ===
Locations of teams in the 2009–10 Football League Championship

Team	Location	Stadium	Capacity
Barnsley	Barnsley	Oakwell	23,009
Blackpool	Blackpool	Bloomfield Road	12,555
Bristol City	Bristol	Ashton Gate	21,497
Cardiff City	Cardiff	Cardiff City Stadium	26,828
Coventry City	Coventry	Ricoh Arena	32,609
Crystal Palace	London	Selhurst Park	26,309
Derby County	Derby	Pride Park Stadium	33,597
Doncaster Rovers	Doncaster	Keepmoat Stadium	15,231
Ipswich Town	Ipswich	Portman Road	30,311
Leicester City	Leicester	Walkers Stadium	32,500
Middlesbrough	Middlesbrough	Riverside Stadium	35,100
Newcastle United	Newcastle upon Tyne	St James' Park	52,387
Nottingham Forest	Nottingham	City Ground	30,602
Peterborough United	Peterborough	London Road Stadium ^{1}	15,460
Plymouth Argyle	Plymouth	Home Park	19,500
Preston North End	Preston	Deepdale	24,500
Queens Park Rangers	London	Loftus Road	19,128
Reading	Reading	Madejski Stadium	24,161
Scunthorpe United	Scunthorpe	Glanford Park ^{1}	9,088
Sheffield United	Sheffield	Bramall Lane	32,609
Sheffield Wednesday	Sheffield	Hillsborough Stadium	39,814
Swansea City	Swansea	Liberty Stadium	20,532
Watford	Watford	Vicarage Road	19,920
West Bromwich Albion	West Bromwich	The Hawthorns	26,500

^{1} Ground contains some terracing

=== Personnel and sponsoring ===
Team	Manager	Team captain	Kit maker	Sponsor
Barnsley	Mark Robins	Stephen Foster	Lotto	Barnsley Building Society
Blackpool	Ian Holloway	Jason Euell	Carbrini	Carbrini
Bristol City	Steve Coppell	Louis Carey	Puma	DAS
Cardiff City	Dave Jones	Mark Hudson	Puma	SBOBET
Coventry City	Chris Coleman	Stephen Wright	Puma	Cassidy Group (home), StadiArena (away)
Crystal Palace	Paul Hart	Shaun Derry	Nike	GAC Logistics
Derby County	Nigel Clough	Robbie Savage	Adidas	Bombardier
Doncaster Rovers	Sean O'Driscoll	Brian Stock	Vandanel	Wright Investments
Ipswich Town	Roy Keane	Jon Walters	Mitre	Marcus Evans
Leicester City	Nigel Pearson	Matt Oakley	Joma	Loros (away)
Middlesbrough	Gordon Strachan	David Wheater	Adidas	Garmin
Newcastle United	Chris Hughton	Nicky Butt	Adidas	Northern Rock
Nottingham Forest	Billy Davies	Paul McKenna	Umbro	Victor Chandler
Peterborough United	Gary Johnson	Joe Lewis	Adidas	MRI Overseas Property
Plymouth Argyle	Paul Mariner	Carl Fletcher	Adidas	Ginsters
Preston North End	Darren Ferguson	Callum Davidson	Canterbury	Enterprise plc
Queens Park Rangers	Neil Warnock	Mikele Leigertwood	Lotto	Gulf Air
Reading	Brian McDermott	Ívar Ingimarsson	Puma	Waitrose
Scunthorpe United	Nigel Adkins	Cliff Byrne	Carlotti	Rainham Steel
Sheffield United	Kevin Blackwell	Chris Morgan	Macron	VisitMalta.com
Sheffield Wednesday	Alan Irvine	Darren Purse	Puma	The Children's Hospital Sheffield
Swansea City	Paulo Sousa	Garry Monk	Umbro	32Red
Watford	Malky Mackay	Jay DeMerit	Joma	Evolution HDTV
West Bromwich Albion	Roberto Di Matteo	Scott Carson	Umbro	England 2018 (9 August 2009)
West Bromwich Albion	Roberto Di Matteo	Scott Carson	Umbro	Bluesqbet (15 December 2009)
West Bromwich Albion	Roberto Di Matteo	Scott Carson	Umbro	SBOBET (21 February 2010 and 2 April 2010)
West Bromwich Albion	Roberto Di Matteo	Scott Carson	Umbro	Bathams (20 March 2010)
West Bromwich Albion	Roberto Di Matteo	Scott Carson	Umbro	Esprit (23 March 2010 and 10 April 2010)
West Bromwich Albion	Roberto Di Matteo	Scott Carson	Umbro	Leons (24 March 2010)

=== Managerial changes ===
Team	Outgoing manager	Manner of departure	Date of vacancy	Position in table	Incoming manager	Date of appointment
Queens Park Rangers	(England) Gareth Ainsworth	End of caretaker spell	9 April 2009	Pre-season	(Northern Ireland) Jim Magilton	3 June 2009
Reading	(England) Steve Coppell	Resigned	12 May 2009	Pre-season	(Northern Ireland) Brendan Rodgers	5 June 2009
Watford	(Northern Ireland) Brendan Rodgers	Signed by Reading	5 June 2009	Pre-season	(Scotland) Malky Mackay	15 June 2009
Swansea City	(Spain) Roberto Martínez	Signed by Wigan Athletic	15 June 2009	Pre-season	(Portugal) Paulo Sousa	23 June 2009
West Bromwich Albion	(England) Tony Mowbray	Signed by Celtic	16 June 2009	Pre-season	(Italy) Roberto Di Matteo	30 June 2009
Barnsley	(Wales) Simon Davey	Sacked	29 August 2009	24th	(England) Mark Robins	11 September 2009
Middlesbrough	(England) Gareth Southgate	Sacked	20 October 2009	3rd	(Scotland) Gordon Strachan	26 October 2009
Peterborough United	(Scotland) Darren Ferguson	Mutual consent	9 November 2009	24th	(England) Mark Cooper	14 November 2009
Plymouth Argyle	(Scotland) Paul Sturrock	Promoted to business support	10 December 2009	23rd	(England) Paul Mariner	10 December 2009
Sheffield Wednesday	(England) Brian Laws	Sacked	13 December 2009	22nd	(Scotland) Alan Irvine	8 January 2010
Reading	(Northern Ireland) Brendan Rodgers	Mutual consent	16 December 2009	21st	(England) Brian McDermott	27 January 2010
Queens Park Rangers	(Northern Ireland) Jim Magilton	Mutual consent	16 December 2009	14th	(England) Paul Hart	17 December 2009
Preston North End	(Scotland) Alan Irvine	Sacked	29 December 2009	16th	(Scotland) Darren Ferguson	6 January 2010
Queens Park Rangers	(England) Paul Hart	Mutual consent	14 January 2010	20th	(England) Neil Warnock	1 March 2010
Peterborough United	(England) Mark Cooper	Sacked	1 February 2010	24th	(England) Jim Gannon	1 February 2010
Crystal Palace	(England) Neil Warnock	Signed by Queens Park Rangers	1 March 2010	21st	(England) Paul Hart	2 March 2010
Bristol City	(England) Gary Johnson	Mutual consent	18 March 2010	16th	(England) Steve Coppell	22 April 2010
Peterborough United	(England) Jim Gannon	Mutual consent	6 April 2010	24th	(England) Gary Johnson	6 April 2010

== League table ==
A total of 24 teams contested the division, including 18 sides remaining in the division from last season, three relegated from the Premier League, and three promoted from League One.

Pos	Team	Pld	W	D	L	GF	GA	GD	Pts	Promotion, qualification or relegation
1	Newcastle United (C, P)	46	30	12	4	90	35	+55	102	Promotion to the Premier League
2	West Bromwich Albion (P)	46	26	13	7	89	48	+41	91	Promotion to the Premier League
3	Nottingham Forest	46	22	13	11	65	40	+25	79	Qualification for Championship play-offs
4	Cardiff City	46	22	10	14	73	54	+19	76	Qualification for Championship play-offs
5	Leicester City	46	21	13	12	61	45	+16	76	Qualification for Championship play-offs
6	Blackpool (O, P)	46	19	13	14	74	58	+16	70	Qualification for Championship play-offs
7	Swansea City	46	17	18	11	40	37	+3	69	
8	Sheffield United	46	17	14	15	62	55	+7	65	
9	Reading	46	17	12	17	68	63	+5	63	
10	Bristol City	46	15	18	13	56	65	−9	63	
11	Middlesbrough	46	16	14	16	58	50	+8	62	
12	Doncaster Rovers	46	15	15	16	59	58	+1	60	
13	Queens Park Rangers	46	14	15	17	58	65	−7	57	
14	Derby County	46	15	11	20	53	63	−10	56	
15	Ipswich Town	46	12	20	14	50	61	−11	56	
16	Watford	46	14	12	20	61	68	−7	54	
17	Preston North End	46	13	15	18	58	73	−15	54	
18	Barnsley	46	14	12	20	53	69	−16	54	
19	Coventry City	46	13	15	18	47	64	−17	54	
20	Scunthorpe United	46	14	10	22	62	84	−22	52	
21	Crystal Palace	46	14	17	15	50	53	−3	49 (Note: Crystal Palace were given a ten-point deduction for entering administration.)	
22	Sheffield Wednesday (R)	46	11	14	21	49	69	−20	47	Relegation to Football League One
23	Plymouth Argyle (R)	46	11	8	27	43	68	−25	41	Relegation to Football League One
24	Peterborough United (R)	46	8	10	28	46	80	−34	34	Relegation to Football League One

Source: The Football League
Rules for classification: 1) points; 2) goal difference; 3) number of goals scored.
(C) Champions; (O) Play-off winners; (P) Promoted; (R) Relegated

== Play-offs ==
Semi-finals
6	Blackpool	2	4	6
3	Nottingham Forest	1	3	4
5	Leicester City	0	3	3
4	Cardiff City (p)	1	2	3

Final at Wembley
6	Blackpool	3
4	Cardiff City	2

=== First leg ===
8 May 2010
12:45 BST

Blackpool	2–1	Nottingham Forest
Southern 26'; Adam 57' (pen.)	(Report)	13' Cohen

Bloomfield Road, Blackpool
Attendance: 11,805
Referee: Phil Dowd
9 May 2010
13:15 BST

Leicester City	0–1	Cardiff City
	(Report)	13' Whittingham

Walkers Stadium, Leicester
Attendance: 29,165
Referee: Alan Wiley

=== Second leg ===
11 May 2010
19:45 BST

Nottingham Forest	3–4	Blackpool
Earnshaw 7', 66'; Adebola 90+2'	(Report)	56', 76', 79' Campbell; 72' Dobbie

City Ground, Nottingham
Attendance: 28,358
Referee: Mark Clattenburg

Blackpool win 6–4 on aggregate

12 May 2010
19:45 BST

Cardiff City	2 – 3 (a.e.t.)	Leicester City
Chopra 21'; Whittingham 69' (pen.)	(Report)	25' Fryatt; 36' (o.g.) Hudson; 49' King
Penalties
Chopra (penalty scored); McCormack (penalty scored); Ledley (penalty scored); Kennedy (penalty scored)	4–3	(penalty scored) Berner; (penalty scored) Howard; (penalty scored) Solano; (penalty missed) Kermorgant; (penalty missed) Waghorn

Cardiff City Stadium, Cardiff
Attendance: 26,033
Referee: Howard Webb

Cardiff City 3–3 Leicester City on aggregate. Cardiff City win 4–3 on penalties

=== Final ===
22 May 2010
15:00 BST

Blackpool	3–2	Cardiff City
Adam 12'; Taylor-Fletcher 39'; Ormerod 45'	(Report)	8' Chopra; 36' Ledley

Wembley Stadium, London
Attendance: 82,244
Referee: Andre Marriner

Blackpool are promoted to the Premier League

== Results ==
Fixtures for the 2009–10 season were announced by The Football League on 17 June 2009.

Home \ Away	BAR	BLP	BRI	CAR	COV	CRY	DER	DON	IPS	LEI	MID	NEW	NOT	PET	PLY	PNE	QPR	REA	SCU	SHU	SHW	SWA	WAT	WBA
Barnsley		1–0	2–3	1–0	0–2	0–0	0–0	0–1	2–1	1–0	2–1	2–2	2–1	2–2	1–3	0–3	0–1	1–3	1–1	2–2	1–2	0–0	1–0	3–1
Blackpool	1–2		1–1	1–1	3–0	2–2	0–0	2–0	1–0	1–2	2–0	2–1	3–1	2–0	2–0	1–1	2–2	2–0	4–1	3–0	1–2	5–1	3–2	2–3
Bristol City	5–3	2–0		0–6	1–1	1–0	2–1	2–5	0–0	1–1	2–1	2–2	1–1	1–1	3–1	4–2	1–0	1–1	1–1	2–3	1–1	1–0	2–2	2–1
Cardiff City	0–2	1–1	3–0		2–0	1–1	6–1	2–1	1–2	2–1	1–0	0–1	1–1	2–0	0–1	1–0	0–2	0–0	4–0	1–1	3–2	2–1	3–1	1–1
Coventry City	3–1	1–1	1–1	1–2		1–1	0–1	1–0	2–1	1–1	2–2	0–2	1–0	3–2	1–1	1–1	1–0	1–3	2–1	3–2	1–1	0–1	0–4	0–0
Crystal Palace	1–1	4–1	0–1	1–2	0–1		1–0	0–3	3–1	0–1	1–0	0–2	1–1	2–0	1–1	3–1	0–2	1–3	0–4	1–0	0–0	0–1	3–0	1–1
Derby County	2–3	0–2	1–0	2–0	2–1	1–1		0–2	1–3	1–0	2–2	3–0	1–0	2–1	2–1	5–3	2–4	2–1	1–4	0–1	3–0	0–1	2–0	2–2
Doncaster Rovers	0–1	3–3	1–0	2–0	0–0	1–1	2–1		3–3	0–1	1–4	0–1	1–0	3–1	1–2	1–1	2–0	1–2	4–3	1–1	1–0	0–0	2–1	2–3
Ipswich Town	1–0	3–1	0–0	2–0	3–2	1–3	1–0	1–1		0–0	1–1	0–4	1–1	0–0	0–2	1–1	3–0	2–1	1–0	0–3	0–0	1–1	1–1	1–1
Leicester City	1–0	2–1	1–3	1–0	2–2	2–0	0–0	0–0	1–1		2–0	0–0	3–0	1–1	1–0	1–2	4–0	1–2	5–1	2–1	3–0	2–1	4–1	1–2
Middlesbrough	2–1	0–3	0–0	0–1	1–1	1–1	2–0	2–0	3–1	0–1		2–2	1–1	1–0	0–1	2–0	2–0	1–1	3–0	0–0	1–0	1–1	0–1	0–5
Newcastle United	6–1	4–1	0–0	5–1	4–1	2–0	0–0	2–1	2–2	1–0	2–0		2–0	3–1	3–1	3–0	1–1	3–0	3–0	2–1	1–0	3–0	2–0	2–2
Nottingham Forest	1–0	0–1	1–1	0–0	2–0	2–0	3–2	4–1	3–0	5–1	1–0	1–0		1–0	3–0	3–0	5–0	2–1	2–0	1–0	2–1	1–0	2–4	0–1
Peterborough United	1–2	0–1	0–1	4–4	0–1	1–1	0–3	1–2	3–1	1–2	2–2	2–3	1–2		1–2	0–1	1–0	3–2	3–0	1–0	1–1	2–2	2–1	2–3
Plymouth Argyle	0–0	0–2	3–2	1–3	0–1	0–1	1–0	2–1	1–1	1–1	0–2	0–2	0–1	1–2		1–1	1–1	4–1	2–1	0–1	1–3	1–1	0–1	0–1
Preston North End	1–4	0–0	2–2	3–0	3–2	1–1	0–0	1–1	2–0	0–1	2–2	0–1	3–2	2–0	2–0		2–2	1–2	3–2	2–1	2–2	2–0	1–1	0–0
Queens Park Rangers	5–2	1–1	2–1	0–1	2–2	1–1	1–1	2–1	1–2	1–2	1–5	0–1	1–1	1–1	2–0	4–0		4–1	0–1	1–1	1–1	1–1	1–0	3–1
Reading	1–0	2–1	2–0	0–1	3–0	2–4	4–1	0–0	1–1	0–1	0–2	1–2	0–0	6–0	2–1	4–1	1–0		1–1	1–3	5–0	1–1	1–1	1–1
Scunthorpe United	2–1	2–4	3–0	1–1	1–0	1–2	3–2	2–2	1–1	1–1	0–2	2–1	2–2	4–0	2–1	3–1	0–1	2–2		3–1	2–0	0–2	2–2	1–3
Sheffield United	0–0	3–0	2–0	3–4	1–0	2–0	1–1	1–1	3–3	1–1	1–0	0–1	0–0	1–0	4–3	1–0	1–1	3–0	0–1		3–2	2–0	2–0	2–2
Sheffield Wednesday	2–2	2–0	0–1	3–1	2–0	2–2	0–0	0–2	0–1	2–0	1–3	2–2	1–1	2–1	2–1	1–2	1–2	0–2	4–0	1–1		0–2	2–1	0–4
Swansea City	3–1	0–0	0–0	3–2	0–0	0–0	1–0	0–0	0–0	1–0	0–3	1–1	0–1	1–0	1–0	2–0	2–0	0–0	3–0	2–1	0–0		1–1	0–2
Watford	1–0	2–2	2–0	0–4	2–3	1–3	0–1	1–1	2–1	3–3	1–1	1–2	0–0	0–1	1–0	2–0	3–1	3–0	3–0	3–0	4–1	0–1		1–1
West Bromwich Albion	1–1	3–2	4–1	0–2	1–0	0–1	3–1	3–1	2–0	3–0	2–0	1–1	1–3	2–0	3–1	3–2	2–2	3–1	2–0	3–1	1–0	0–1	5–0	

Updated to match(es) played on 2 May 2010. Source: The Football League
Legend: Blue = home team win; Yellow = draw; Red = away team win.

== Top goalscorers and assists ==
Rank	Scorer	Club	Goals
1	(England) Peter Whittingham	Cardiff City	20
1	(England) Nicky Maynard	Bristol City	20
3	(England) Gary Hooper	Scunthorpe United	19
4	(England) Andy Carroll	Newcastle United	17
4	(England) Kevin Nolan	Newcastle United	17
6	(Scotland) Charlie Adam	Blackpool	16
6	(Iceland) Gylfi Sigurðsson	Reading	16
6	(England) Michael Chopra	Cardiff City	16
9	(Wales) Robert Earnshaw	Nottingham Forest	15
9	(England) Darren Ambrose	Crystal Palace	15
9	(England) Billy Sharp	Doncaster Rovers	15

Pos	Player	Team	Assists
1	(Scotland) Graham Dorrans	West Bromwich Albion	19
2	(England) Wayne Routledge	Queens Park Rangers/Newcastle United	15
3	(England) Danny Guthrie	Newcastle United	13
4	(England) Jay Bothroyd	Cardiff City	12
5	(England) Peter Whittingham	Cardiff City	10
6	(Scotland) George Boyd	Peterborough United/Nottingham Forest	9
6	(England) Paul Hayes	Scunthorpe United	9
6	(Poland) Radosław Majewski	Nottingham Forest	9
6	(Jamaica) Jobi McAnuff	Reading	9
6	(Iceland) Gylfi Sigurðsson	Reading	9
11	(Scotland) Charlie Adam	Blackpool	8

== Season statistics ==
=== Scoring ===
- First goal of the season: Miles Addison for Derby County against Peterborough United, 4:00 minutes (8 August 2009)
- Fastest goal in a match: 23 seconds
  - Billy Clarke for Blackpool against Preston North End (30 November 2009)
  - Daryl Murphy for Ipswich Town against Middlesbrough (6 February 2010)
- Goal scored at the latest point in a match: 90+6:12 – Pablo Couñago for Ipswich Town against Coventry City (16 January 2010)
- First own goal of the season: Kaspars Gorkšs (Queens Park Rangers) for Plymouth Argyle, 90+2:26 minutes (15 August 2009)
- First penalty kick of the season: Paul Hartley (scored) for Bristol City against Preston North End, 48:35 (8 August 2009)
- Widest winning margin: 6
  - Bristol City 0–6 Cardiff City (26 January 2010)
  - Reading 6–0 Peterborough United (17 April 2010)
- Most goals in one half: 6
  - Newcastle United 6–1 Barnsley (5 March 2010)
  - Bristol City 2–5 Doncaster Rovers (5 March 2010)
- Most goals in one half by a single team: 5
  - Newcastle United 6–1 Barnsley (5 March 2010)
- Most goals scored by losing team: 3
  - Sheffield United 3–4 Cardiff City (24 October 2009)
  - Sheffield United 4–3 Plymouth Argyle (27 February 2010)
  - Bristol City 5–3 Barnsley (23 March 2010)
  - Doncaster Rovers 4–3 Scunthorpe United (24 April 2010)
  - Nottingham Forest 3–4 Blackpool (11 May 2010)
- Most goals scored by one player in a match: 4
  - Michael Chopra (Cardiff City vs. Derby County) – 36, 57, 62, 75 minutes (29 September 2009)

Hat-tricks
Player	Nationality	For	Against	Result	Goals scored	Date	Ref
Shola Ameobi	Nigeria	Newcastle United	Reading	3–0	3	15 August 2009	
Michael Chopra	England	Cardiff City	Plymouth Argyle	3–1	3	18 August 2009	
Kevin Nolan	England	Newcastle United	Ipswich Town	4–0	3	26 September 2009	
Michael Chopra	England	Cardiff City	Derby County	6–1	4	29 September 2009	
Peter Whittingham	England	Cardiff City	Sheffield United	4–3	3	24 October 2009	
Darius Henderson	England	Sheffield United	Bristol City	3–2	3	28 November 2009	
Robert Earnshaw	Wales	Nottingham Forest	Leicester City	5–1	3	5 December 2009	
Freddy Eastwood	Wales	Coventry City	Peterborough United	3–2	3	12 December 2009	
Paul Gallagher	Scotland	Leicester City	Scunthorpe United	5–1	3	13 February 2010	

=== Discipline ===
- First yellow card of the season: Rhys Williams for Middlesbrough against Sheffield United, 49:15 minutes (7 August 2009)
- First red card of the season: Luke Chambers for Nottingham Forest against Reading, 87:41 minutes (8 August 2009)
- Card given at latest point in a game: Wes Morgan (yellow) at 90+7:07 minutes for Nottingham Forest against Bristol City (3 April 2010)
- Most yellow cards in a single match: 9
  - Bristol City 2–3 Sheffield United – 4 for Bristol City (Lee Johnson, Louis Carey, Jamie McAllister and Ivan Sproule) and 5 for Sheffield United (Jamie Ward, Kyle Walker, Darius Henderson, Jordan Stewart and Stephen Quinn) (28 November 2009)
  - Cardiff City 2–3 Leicester City – 3 for Cardiff City (Paul Quinn, Mark Hudson, Stephen McPhail) and 6 for Leicester City (Alex Bruce, Nolberto Solano, Andy King, Lloyd Dyer, Richie Wellens, Steve Howard) (11 May 2010)
- Quickest card given at the start of the match: 26 Seconds – Nicky Maynard for Bristol City against Nottingham Forest (7 November 2009)
- Quickest card given after coming on: 1:07 minutes – Alassane N'Diaye for Crystal Palace against Blackpool (20 March 2010)
- Most fouls: Jay Bothroyd 103 fouls
- Total number of yellow cards: 1636
- Total number of red cards: 86

== Monthly awards ==
Month	Manager of the Month		Player of the Month		Notes
Month	Manager	Club	Player	Club	Notes
August	(Republic of Ireland) Chris Hughton	Newcastle United	(Nigeria) Shola Ameobi	Newcastle United	
September	(Republic of Ireland) Chris Hughton	Newcastle United	(Republic of Ireland) Leon Best	Coventry City	
October	(England) Dave Jones	Cardiff City	(England) Peter Whittingham	Cardiff City	
November	(Republic of Ireland) Chris Hughton	Newcastle United	(England) Darren Ambrose	Crystal Palace	
December	(Scotland) Billy Davies	Nottingham Forest	(Northern Ireland) Lee Camp	Nottingham Forest	
January	(Scotland) Alan Irvine	Sheffield Wednesday	(Scotland) Charlie Adam	Blackpool	
February	(England) Nigel Pearson	Leicester City	(Scotland) Paul Gallagher	Leicester City	
March	(England) Brian McDermott	Reading	(Iceland) Gylfi Sigurðsson	Reading	
April	(Republic of Ireland) Chris Hughton	Newcastle United	(England) Kevin Nolan	Newcastle United	

== Team of the Year ==

=== PFA Team of the Year ===
PFA Team of the Year
Goalkeeper	(England) Lee Camp (Nottingham Forest)			
Defenders	(Wales) Chris Gunter (Nottingham Forest)	(Argentina) Fabricio Coloccini (Newcastle United)	(Wales) Ashley Williams (Swansea City)	(Spain) José Enrique (Newcastle United)
Midfielders	(Scotland) Graham Dorrans (West Bromwich Albion)	(England) Kevin Nolan (Newcastle United)	(Scotland) Charlie Adam (Blackpool)	(England) Peter Whittingham (Cardiff City)
Forwards	(England) Andy Carroll (Newcastle United)		(England) Michael Chopra (Cardiff City)	

== Events ==
=== Controversy ===
- 15 August 2009

During a game between Bristol City and Crystal Palace, Freddie Sears scored a goal that ricocheted off the stanchion and went back out, but the linesman didn't see the goal and so it was disallowed. Crystal Palace manager Neil Warnock called for a replay. Following the game, the three officials were suspended until it could be solved.

- 28 November 2009

The tie between Plymouth and Barnsley was abandoned after 58 minutes because of heavy rain affecting the pitch. Barnsley were winning 4–1 and manager Mark Robins argued that it was a "let off" for Plymouth and that the travelling Barnsley fans should be reimbursed. The postponed match took place on 30 March, where it ended in a 0–0 draw.

=== Crystal Palace administration ===
On 27 January 2010, the Football League had announced that Crystal Palace had been placed into administration and Sheffield firm P&A Partnership were appointed as administrators for the club. Palace were docked ten points and dropped from 9th to 21st. They managed to survive another season in the Championship, but only after drawing 2–2 with Sheffield Wednesday on the final day and confined Wednesday to League One football in 2010–11.

== Attendances ==
No.	Club	Average	Change	Highest	Lowest
1	Newcastle United	43,388	-11.0%	52,181	36,944
2	Derby County	29,230	-0.7%	33,010	26,186
3	Sheffield United	25,120	-3.5%	29,210	22,555
4	Leicester City	23,943	18.2%	31,759	18,928
5	Nottingham Forest	23,831	6.9%	29,155	18,332
6	Sheffield Wednesday	23,179	7.6%	37,121	18,329
7	West Bromwich Albion	22,199	-14.0%	25,297	19,390
8	Ipswich Town	20,841	-0.6%	27,059	19,283
9	Cardiff City	20,717	14.8%	25,630	17,686
10	Middlesbrough	19,948	-29.8%	27,721	16,847
11	Reading	17,408	-12.7%	23,163	14,096
12	Coventry City	17,305	-0.6%	22,209	14,426
13	Swansea City	15,407	1.5%	18,794	12,775
14	Crystal Palace	14,771	-3.0%	20,643	12,328
15	Bristol City	14,601	-13.2%	19,144	13,009
16	Watford	14,345	-3.5%	17,120	12,179
17	Queens Park Rangers	13,349	-5.3%	17,082	10,940
18	Barnsley	12,964	-1.7%	20,079	11,116
19	Preston North End	12,935	-3.7%	19,840	10,270
20	Doncaster Rovers	10,992	-8.1%	14,850	8,827
21	Plymouth Argyle	10,316	-9.7%	14,792	7,243
22	Peterborough United	8,913	17.3%	12,877	6,445
23	Blackpool	8,611	9.8%	12,296	6,855
24	Scunthorpe United	6,464	28.7%	8,921	4,995
