= Chelsea Building Society =

UK building society

Yorkshire Building Society trading as Chelsea Building Society
- Company type: Building Society (Mutual)
- Industry: Banking and financial services
- Founded: 31 December 1966 (current structure)
- Headquarters: Cheltenham, England
- Key people: Susan Allen, Chief Executive
- Products: Savings, Mortgages, Insurance
- Net income: £157 million GBP (December 2012)
- Total assets: £33.5 billion GBP (December 2012)
- Parent: Yorkshire Building Society
- Website: www.thechelsea.co.uk

Chelsea Building Society is a trading name of Yorkshire Building Society based in Bradford, West Yorkshire. Chelsea merged with the Yorkshire in 2010, at which point Chelsea was the fourth largest building society in the United Kingdom, with assets in excess of £13 billion and 35 branches, mainly in the southern areas of England, particularly in London.

Chelsea now forms part of the Yorkshire Building Society Group, alongside Yorkshire Building Society and the Norwich and Peterborough Building Society. In January 2016, Yorkshire Building Society announced that seven of the Chelsea's branches would close, with the remainder rebranded as Yorkshire. This essentially means Chelsea is an online only brand and currently provides basic savings accounts and mortgage products.

== History ==
=== Formation and growth ===
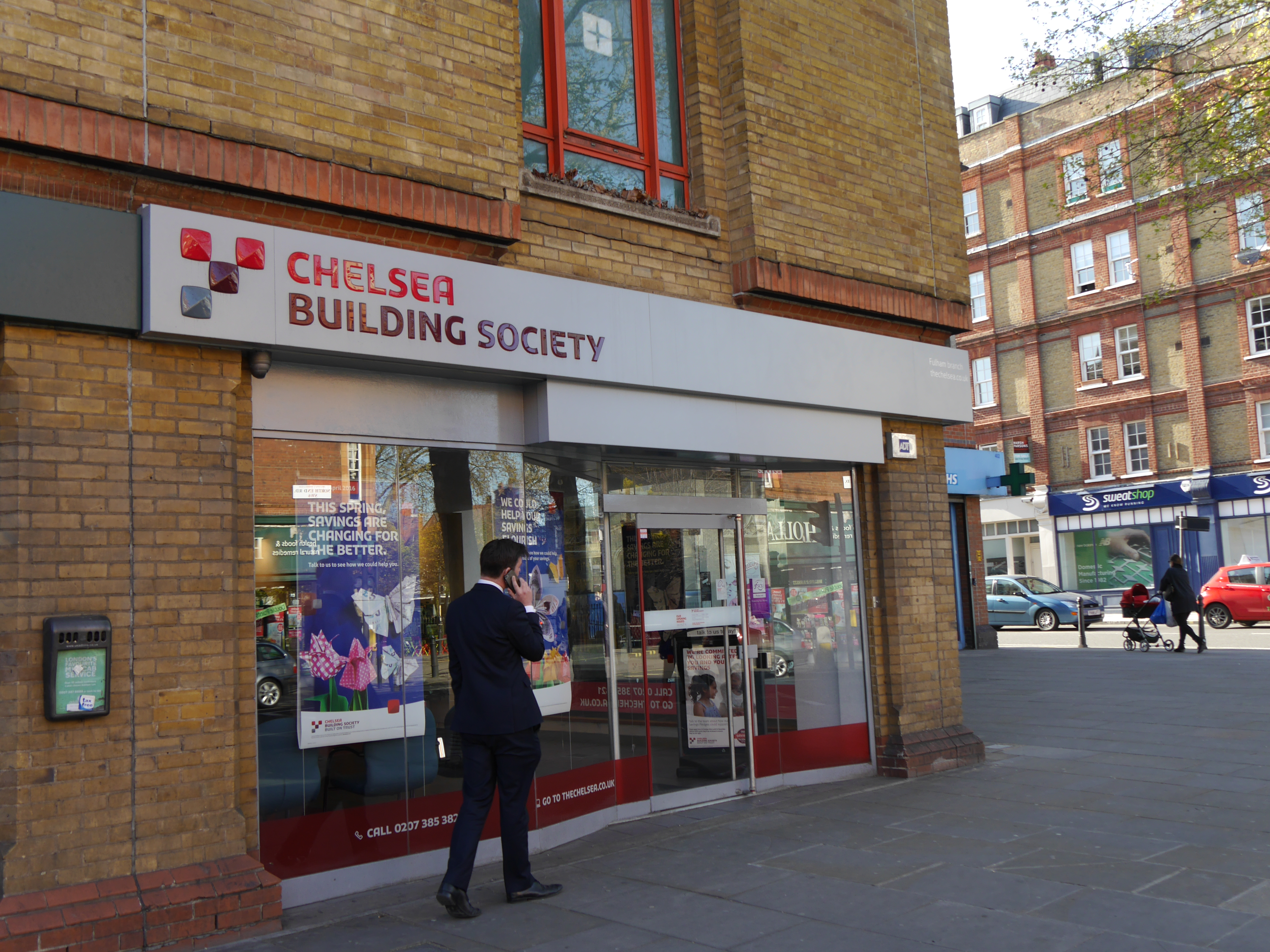
Chelsea Building Society, North End Road, Fulham, London

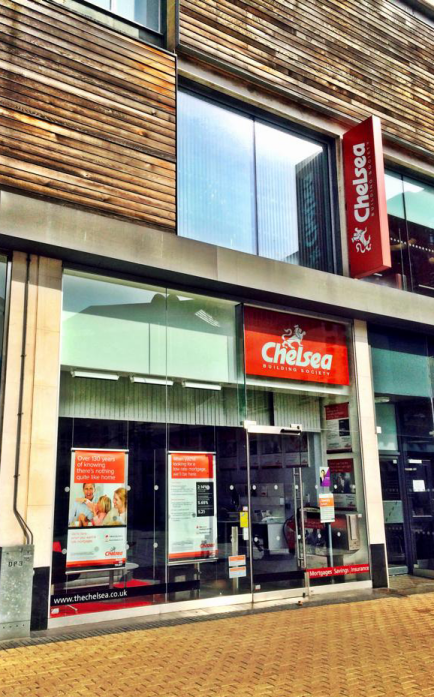
A branch of the Chelsea in Bristol, displaying pre-YBS branding

Chelsea was first established as the London & Camberwell Building Society in 1875. Three years later, in 1878, the Borough of Chelsea Permanent Building Society was formed. Over the years both societies merged with smaller societies and on 31 December 1966 the two societies merged to form the Chelsea and South London Building Society. The name was changed to Chelsea Building Society in April 1971.

Following the merger in 1966, the administrative headquarters were in Streatham, with the registered office at 110 Kings Road, Chelsea. In 1973, having outgrown the accommodation at Streatham, the administrative headquarters moved to Thirlestaine Hall in Cheltenham. On 1 July 1988 Chelsea completed a merger with the City of London Building Society, with the name Chelsea remaining unaffected.

In 2005 Chelsea opened a purpose-built customer contact centre close to the Head Office at the former Charlton Kings railway station as a commitment to keep its call centres UK based, which won environmental awards for its use of geothermal heating, green building and "green" credentials.

In February 2007 the society acquired Britannia Capital Securities, a medium-sized independent firm of secured loan and mortgage brokers operating in the UK, in order to further diversify their lending.

The Catholic Building Society was acquired by the Chelsea Building Society in December 2008.

=== Financial difficulties ===
On 10 October 2008, Chelsea revealed that £55 million of its liquid assets (1.55%) were invested in the troubled Icelandic banks. In August 2009 it was revealed Chelsea had written off £41m in "potentially fraudulent loans", mainly from its Buy to Let mortgage book which had been underwritten between 2006 and 2008. In the results for the six months ended 30 June 2009, writing off the fraudulent loans caused the society to report a net loss of £29 million.

This caused confidence in the Society to fall, both with members and rating agencies such as Moody's Corporation who downgraded their rating to "Baa3". This lower rating made it significantly more challenging for the Society to attract deposits.

=== Merger with the Yorkshire Building Society ===
On 1 December 2009, Chelsea announced that it was in advanced merger talks with Yorkshire Building Society. The following day they announced a formal merger. At a Special General Meeting in Bradford on 23 January 2010, Yorkshire Building Society members approved the merger proposal. The merger completed on 1 April 2010.

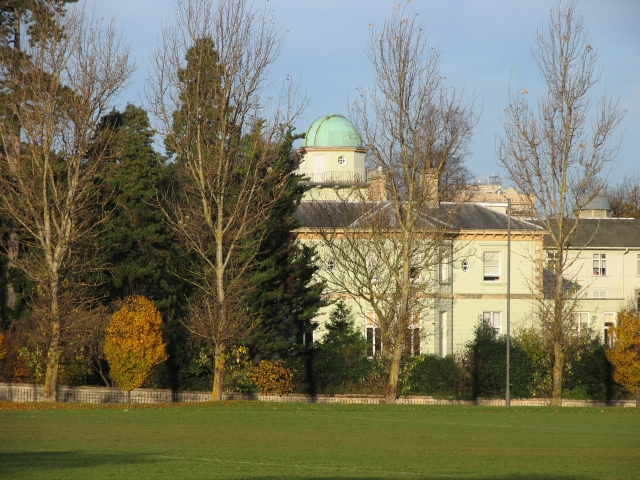
Thirlestaine Hall and its copper dome

Yorkshire announced the closure of Chelsea's operational presence at the original Cheltenham Head Office in Thirlestaine Road by 2011, relocating the remaining staff to the second, smaller site at the former Charlton Kings railway station. The Thirlestaine Hall site was sold to developers in 2012 to build a gated housing estate and care home, known as Thirlestaine Park. Much of what Chelsea had constructed to accommodate its business needs was demolished and the Grade II listed Thirlestaine Hall was converted into luxury flats, with the copper-domed observatory preserved.

In January 2016, it was announced that seven of the Chelsea's branches would close by September, with the rest to be rebranded under the Yorkshire brand. Products and services under the Chelsea brand would continue to be available online and by telephone.

The number of staff at the second smaller Head Office site gradually reduced as the society transitioned functions to the Yorkshire Head Office in Bradford. The Charlton Kings offices were officially closed at the end of 2019. The building was later sold to Spirax-Sarco Engineering who moved into the building in 2021.
