= Norwich and Peterborough Building Society =

Yorkshire Building Society trading as Norwich & Peterborough Building Society
- Type: Building Society (Mutual)
- Industry: Financial services
- Founded: 1860 (Incorporated 1896)
- Headquarters: Bradford
- Number of locations: 1
- Key people: John Heaps LLB, Chairman; Susan Allen, Chief Executive
- Products: Retail Banking, Savings and Investments, Mortgages, Surveying, General Insurance Broking and Share Dealing
- Net income: £157 million GBP (December 2012)
- Total assets: £33.5 billion GBP (December 2012)
- Parent: Yorkshire Building Society
- Website: www.nandp.co.uk

Norwich & Peterborough Building Society (N&P) is a trading name of Yorkshire Building Society based in Bradford, West Yorkshire. Formed by the merger of the Norwich and Peterborough building societies in 1986, at the time of merger with YBS, it was the ninth largest building society in the United Kingdom, with assets in excess of £4.9 billion.

The Society had over 45 branch offices mainly located in East Anglia and the surrounding counties of Northamptonshire and Lincolnshire, but there was also a branch in Gibraltar (which opened in 1990 and closed in 2014) and High Holborn, London. The former Head Office was opened by Queen Elizabeth the Second in 1988, on a green field business park at Lynch Wood, Peterborough, where an important operational presence is retained by the Yorkshire. N&P employed over 800 staff, of whom roughly half were based at Lynch Wood.

In January 2017, parent YBS Group announced the proposed closure of 28 (later increased to 31) branches, all current accounts and the eventual withdrawal of the N&P brand. Remaining N&P branches closed on Friday 6 July 2018 and re-opened on Monday 9 July as YBS branches.

== History ==
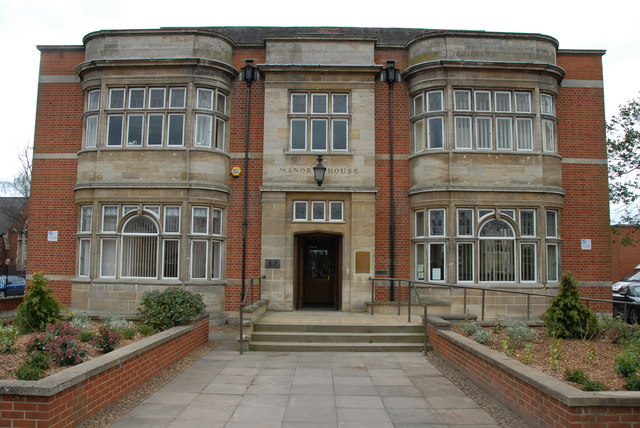
Manor House, former headquarters of the Peterborough Building Society.

The Norwich Building Society was founded in 1852 under the title of Norwich District Provident Permanent Benefit Building and Freehold Land Society. This was unconnected with the mutual Norwich Union Society for the Insurance of Houses, Stock and Merchandise from Fire, which had been founded in 1797. After the Second World War, in 1947, the Norwich Benefit Building Society incorporated, ceasing to act in the name of its trustees, and the name was simplified. The Society absorbed Thetford, Norfolk and Suffolk Mutual Benefit Building Society in 1961.

Shortly after, in 1860, Peterborough Provincial Benefit Building Society was established by railway workers at the Corn Exchange, Peterborough and, in 1896, it registered under the Building Societies Act 1874 (37 & 38 Vict. c. 42). The fast growth of the railways had not only created large numbers of workers, it had also led to a shortage of housing in the Peterborough area. The new Society enabled its members to build their own homes in the city. Although originally limited to railwaymen, the Society opened its membership to the general public in 1924, moving to new premises in Priestgate. In 1962, its name was changed to the Peterborough Building Society and, soon after, the Head Office moved to a refurbished building in Market Place (later renamed Cathedral Square). The first branch office was opened at March, Cambridgeshire in 1961. The Society absorbed King's Lynn Building Society in 1967, which was based in the offices of the estate agents Geoffrey Collins & Co. at Blackfriars Street. Further mergers followed with Stamford Building Society in 1980 and Argyle Building Society in 1985.

Norwich and Peterborough Building Society was formed by the merger of the two societies in 1986. At that time the Peterborough's assets were £280m and the Norwich's were £176m. An entirely separate City of Peterborough and District Permanent Building Society transferred engagements to Northampton Town and County Building Society in 1959. Anglia Building Society was formed by amalgamation of this Society with Leicestershire Building Society in 1966 and subsequently merged with Nationwide Building Society in 1987.

=== Merger ===
N&P logotype prior to YBS Group rebrand, used 2009–2014

The Society conducted regular dialogues through members’ meetings and other events. It was clear from these that members had a high level of trust in the Society and wished it to continue as a mutual; a stance confirmed by the Board. In order to help maintain normal business activities for the benefit of all members without the disruption caused by speculative activity, new customers opening savings accounts providing membership of the Society were required to enter into an agreement to assign to the Charities Aid Foundation any windfall benefits to which they may have become entitled in the future as an investing member.

In December 2010, it was reported that the Society had received a number of takeover approaches and was keeping its options open. The Society had sold Keydata Investment Services products to some 3,100 customers via its independent financial advisers between November 2005 and June 2009, when the firm was put into administration by the FSA. In July 2009, the Serious Fraud Office commenced an investigation into Keydata Investment Services Ltd. following a referral by the FSA. Shortly afterwards, in November 2009, the Society announced the closure of 10 branches largely outside its "regional heartland" effective March 2010 and in January 2011, chief executive, Matthew Bullock, announced his retirement once a successor could be found. In light of tougher regulation, Aviva Life Services UK Ltd. (formerly Norwich Union) was reappointed to provide financial advice to members.

Following expressions of interest by US equity firm JC Flowers (see Kent Reliance), Sir Richard Branson's Virgin Money and Coventry Building Society, the Board entered into exclusive discussions with Yorkshire Building Society on 19 March 2011. On 22 March, the Society announced it would repay investor losses arising from the collapse of Keydata. Mr. Bullock stepped down on 31 March; Anne Gunther, former chief executive of Standard Life Bank, was appointed to the role on 20 April and the merger agreed following due diligence. On the Board's "strong recommendation", shareholding and borrowing members voted in favour of the proposal at an Extraordinary General Meeting held in Peterborough on 22 August. FSA approval followed on 23 September and the transfer of engagements was completed on 1 November, ending 160 years of independent trading.

== Services ==
The Society's principal purpose was the making of loans which were secured on residential property and funded substantially by its members. However, for its size, the Society offered a wide range of financial services and advice to its 470,000 customers. Cheques and bank giro credits were cleared through HSBC Bank Plc (until 2015, The Co-operative Bank Plc) and a MasterCard branded credit card was issued on behalf of the Society by MBNA Europe Bank Ltd.

Code	Note
08-60-81	to 22 January 2015
40-65-00	from 23 January 2015

Norwich & Peterborough also operated via a telephone call centre based in Peterborough and through a fully transactional website. The Society had three established affinity accounts with Norwich City FC, Peterborough United FC and Lincoln City FC.

The Society only offered mortgage facilities for properties in England, Wales, Gibraltar or situated in defined geographical areas of the Costa del Sol and the Costa Blanca, Spain. In 2007, it became one of the first building societies to achieve the CarbonNeutral quality mark. Yorkshire Building Society (trading as Norwich & Peterborough) is authorised and regulated by the Financial Services Authority. It is a member of the Building Societies Association and the LINK Interchange Network. As a current account provider, N&P was also affiliated to Bankers' Automated Clearing Services and subscribed to the Lending Code. From 2001, its ATMs were operated by Moneybox Corporation.

Yorkshire Building Society also operates under the trading names of Chelsea Building Society (since 2010, including the engagements of the former Catholic Building Society) and Egg (since 2011). The Yorkshire is a participant of the Financial Services Compensation Scheme; therefore, deposits with any of N&P, the Yorkshire, Chelsea and Egg were treated as linked for the purposes the scheme.

=== Subsidiaries ===
Stylised Norwich Cathedral logo, used 1986–2009, refreshed in 2002

The Norwich and Peterborough Group included the following trading companies, which were wholly owned by the parent Society:

- Norwich and Peterborough (LBS) Ltd., trading as Astra Mortgages
- Norwich and Peterborough Insurance Brokers Ltd.
- Norwich and Peterborough General Insurance Ltd.
- Norwich and Peterborough Sharedealing Services Ltd., formerly Waters, Lunniss & Co. Ltd.
- Norwich and Peterborough Covered Bonds LLP
- Lynchwood Services Limited
- Flexible Choice Limited

Hockleys Professional Limited, trading as Hockleys Surveyors, was acquired by estate agents Connells Residential Ltd. in 2007.

== See also ==
- Anglia Regional Co-operative Society
