= Haywards Heath Building Society =

- Type: Mutual
- Industry: Building Society
- Founded: 20 December 1890 in Haywards Heath, England
- Defunct: 31 December 1992 (102 years)
- Fate: Merged with Yorkshire Building Society
- Successor: Yorkshire Building Society

The Haywards Heath Building Society was founded in 1890 as the Haywards Heath & District Permanent Benefit Building Society, abbreviating its name in 1962. It merged with the Yorkshire Building Society in 1992.The merger provided the core of Yorkshire Building Society's expansion outside of Yorkshire.

== History ==
The Haywards Heath & District Permanent Benefit Building Society was formed in 1860 by local Haywards Heath tradesmen. Its first Secretary was dismissed after five years following losses but 1897 saw the appointment of Charles Mackenzie, an accountant, as Secretary, a position he was to hold for over forty years. The Society was run from an office in his home and it was a measure of the small size of the Society that it was not until the eve of Mackenzie's retirement that an independent building was acquired.

The Society expanded over the years in line with the growth of Haywards Heath but its expansion outside the town relied largely on agents and solicitors; only a year after its formation, agencies were opened in four local villages. It was not until 1933 that the first branch was opened in East Grinstead, having developed out of an earlier agency. The 1930s was a boom period for the private housebuilding industry; the Society's mortgages trebled between 1933 and 1939 and loans were being granted across the south coast. After WWII a branch was considered for Reigate but rejected in favour of the agency approach. In 1955 a panel of solicitors was appointed giving coverage from Brighton to Croydon. Finally, in 1970, another branch was opened, Burgess Hill. At long intervals, Crowborough followed in 1979 and Tunbridge Wells in 1985 – the first branch outside Sussex. In 1988, assets reached £100m.

The coverage of the Haywards Heath Society proved attractive to the Yorkshire Building Society, which was seeking to expand its coverage in the south, and it duly acquired the Society in 1992.

== See also ==
Following his 1990 history, Wyn K Ford later wrote a paper in 1992 for the Sussex Archaeological Society about the Society's first forty years.
