= Charlton Kings railway station =

Former railway station in Gloucestershire, England

Charlton Kings
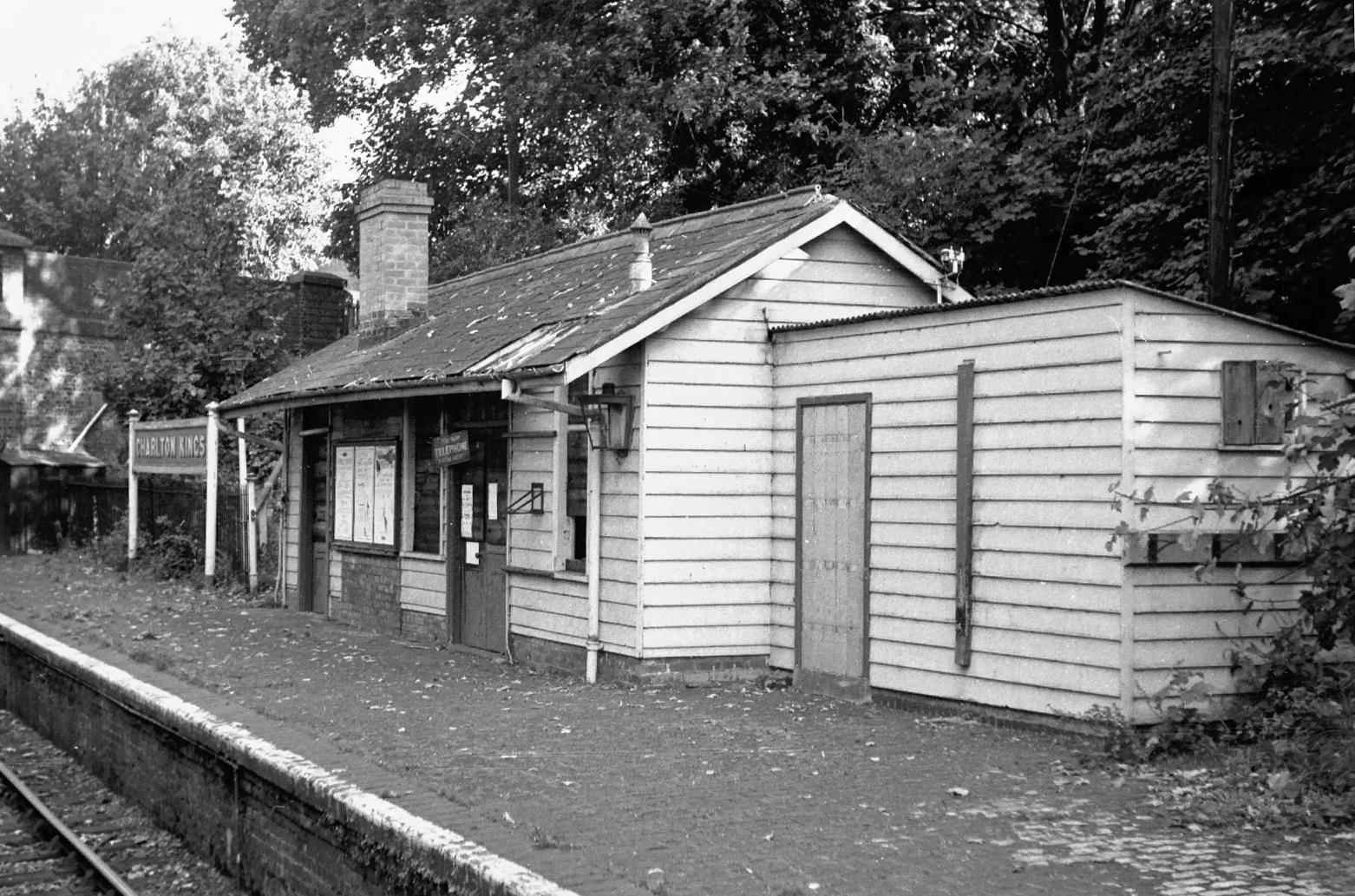
- June 1962

General information
- Location: Charlton Kings, Cheltenham; England
- Coordinates: 51.8759°N 2.0548°W
- Grid reference: SO964196
- Platforms: 2

Other information
- Status: Disused

History
- Original company: Banbury and Cheltenham Direct Railway
- Pre-grouping: Great Western Railway
- Post-grouping: Great Western Railway; Western Region of British Railways

Key dates
- 1 June 1881: Station opens
- 15 October 1962: Station closes
Location

Charlton Kings railway station was a small station in Gloucestershire serving the village of Charlton Kings and the southern outskirts of Cheltenham Spa.

== History ==
The station opened in 1881 with the opening of the Bourton-on-the-Water to Cheltenham section of the Banbury and Cheltenham Direct Railway, which was operated and later taken over by the Great Western Railway.

From 1891, Charlton Kings station was also served by trains on the Midland and South Western Junction Railway line, which branched off the Banbury and Cheltenham line at Andoversford and formed a north–south link between Cheltenham to Swindon, Andover and the south coast. The M&SWJR had running rights over the GWR line.

Charlton Kings was a small station with a wooden building. The line through it was particularly busy during the First World War and the Second World War with heavy troop and machinery movements on the M&SWJR.But traffic declined rapidly after the Second World War, and Charlton Kings also faced competition from road transport services. The station was reduced to "halt" status in 1956, with goods facilities withdrawn a couple of years before that.

The M&SWJR line closed to passenger traffic in September 1961, and services on the Banbury to Cheltenham line were withdrawn on 15 October 1962, when Charlton Kings station closed. There is no trace of the station today.

Chelsea Building Society bought the disused land around 2004 and built a second smaller head office to contain its expanding head office operations. The site of the former station is now occupied by a Lidl store..

Preceding station	Disused railways	Following station
Cheltenham Leckhampton; Line and station closed	Great Western Railway; Midland and South Western Junction Railway	Andoversford Junction; Line and station closed
Cheltenham Leckhampton; Line and station closed	Great Western Railway; Banbury and Cheltenham Direct Railway	Andoversford Junction; Line and station closed
