= Yorkshire Building Society =

Financial institution in the United Kingdom

- Company type: Building society (mutual)
- Industry: Financial services
- Founded: 19 August 1864
- Headquarters: Bradford, West Yorkshire, England
- Number of locations: 231
- Key people: John Heaps (chairman); Susan Allen (chief executive)
- Products: Mortgages, savings, investments, insurance
- Revenue: ▼£786.4 million (2023)
- Operating income: ▼£450.3 million (2023)
- Net income: ▼£331.7 million (2023)
- Total assets: ▲£60,969 million (2023)
- Total equity: ▲£3,699 million (2023)
- Number of employees: ▼3,117 (2022); 3,249 (2021)
- Website: Official website

Yorkshire Building Society is the third largest building society in the UK, with its headquarters in Bradford, West Yorkshire, England. It is a member of the Building Societies Association. At December 2023, the Society had total assets of more than £60 billion.

The society also owns the Chelsea Building Society and Norwich and Peterborough Building Society, as well as Accord Mortgages and the savings business of Egg, which are referred to as the Yorkshire Building Society Group. Collectively the group employs 3,300 staff throughout the UK and serves 3 million members.

== History ==
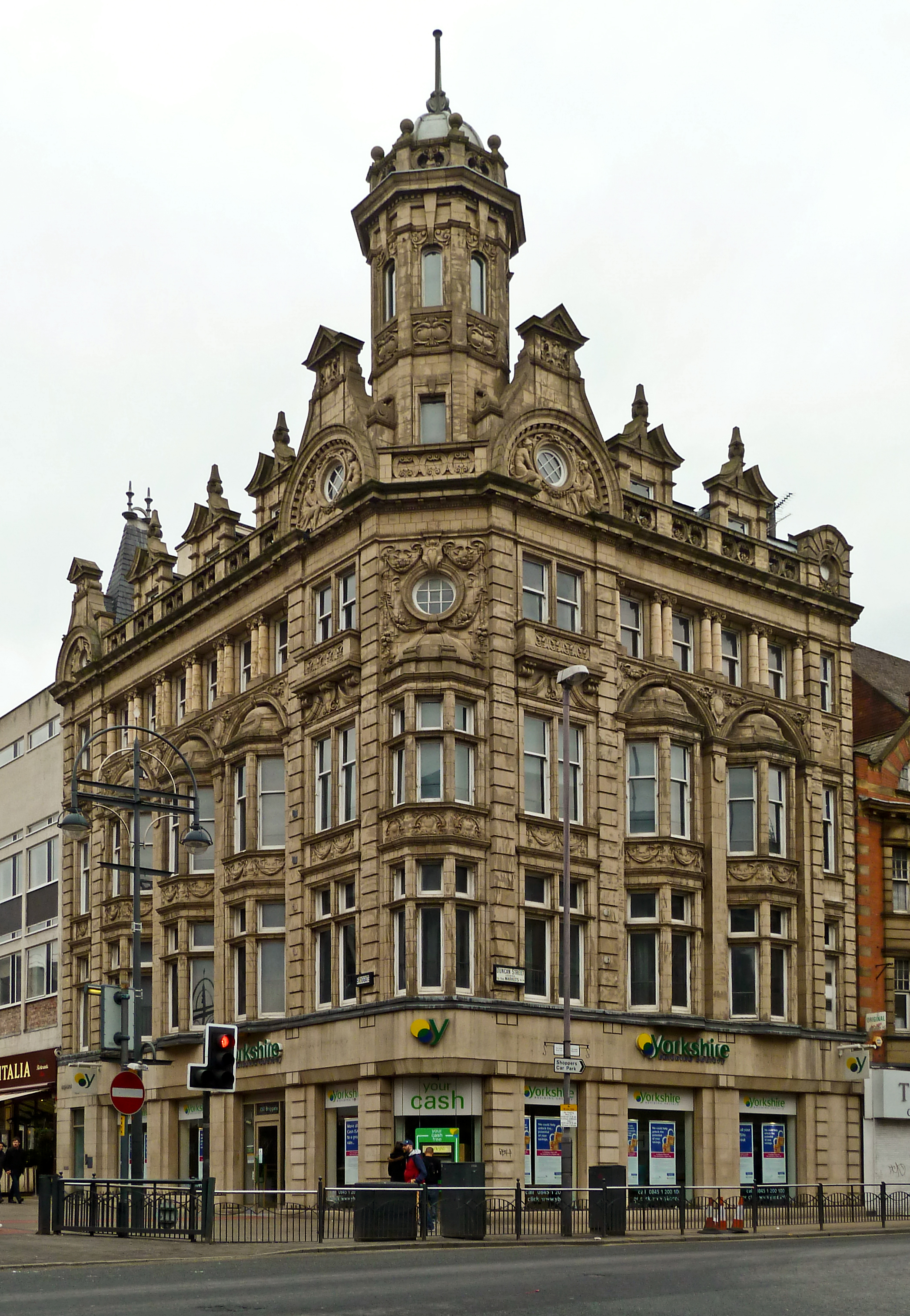
Yorkshire Building Society branch on Briggate in Leeds

The society has its origins in the Huddersfield Equitable Permanent Benefit Building Society which was founded in Huddersfield in 1864.

It merged with the Bradford Permanent Building Society to form the Huddersfield & Bradford Building Society in 1975.

High Point on Westgate in Bradford was built as the headquarters of Yorkshire Building Society in the 1970s.

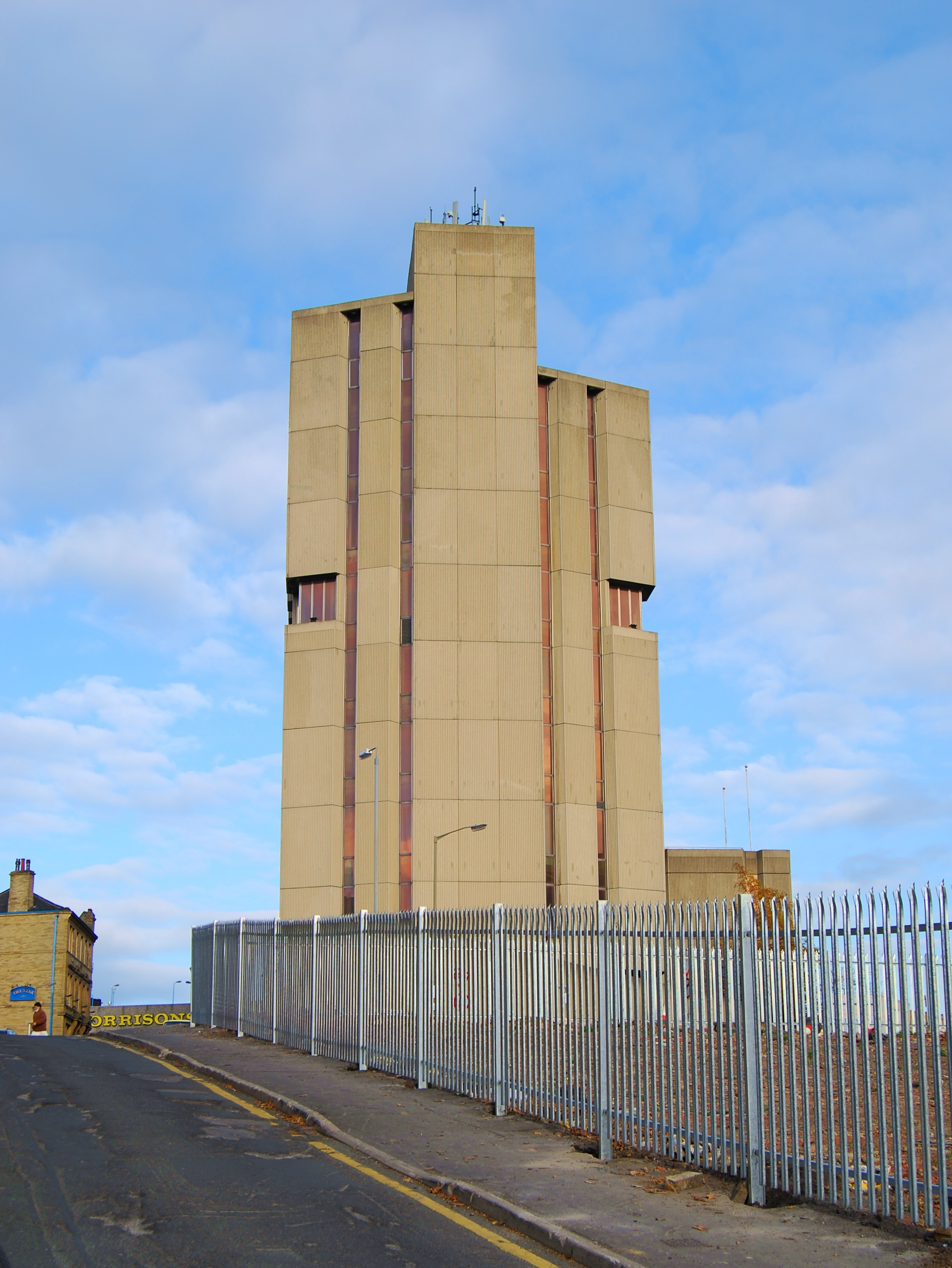
High Point in November 2007

It then merged with the West Yorkshire Building Society to form the Yorkshire Building Society in December 1981.

The Yorkshire took over the Sussex-based Haywards Heath Building Society in December 1992.

In December 2001, the society merged with the Gainsborough Building Society.

In 2008, the Yorkshire merged with the Barnsley Building Society which had become a victim of the Icelandic banking crisis.

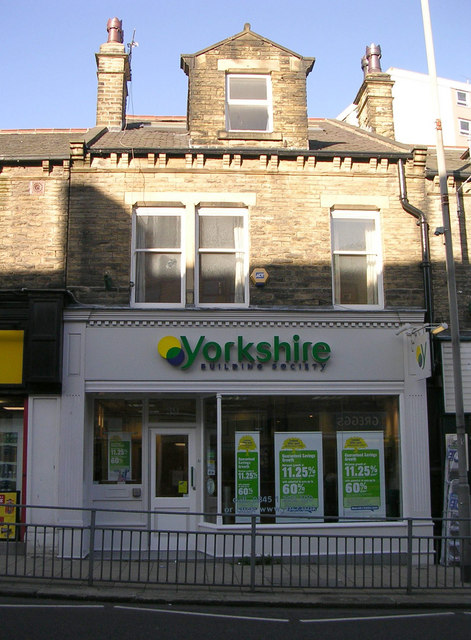
The Yorkshire Building Society branch in Farsley

In 2009, the Yorkshire noted that they were in advanced merger talks with Chelsea Building Society. The following day it was announced that they were to merge.

The ninth largest building society at the time, Norwich and Peterborough, entered into merger discussions with the Society on 19 March 2011. Following due diligence by the Yorkshire board, N&P members voted in favour of the proposal on 22 August. FSA approval followed on 23 September and the transfer of engagements was completed on 1 November. With almost no geographical overlap, the N&P name was retained as a separate and distinct brand.

On 25 July 2011, the Yorkshire announced it was buying the Egg savings and mortgage business from Citi in a deal worth £2.5 billion.

== Brass band ==
In 1993, the former Hammonds Sauce Works Band was renamed as the Yorkshire Building Society Band. The building society supported the main band and also the YBS Hawley Band and YBS Juniors. The building society ceased its sponsorship in December 2004 although the YBS initials were retained in the band's name until 2008. From January 2009, the band was renamed the Hammonds Saltaire Band.

== See also ==
- List of banks
- List of banks in United Kingdom
