= The Ministry of Nostalgia =

2016 book by Owen Hatherley

- First edition
- Author: Owen Hatherley
- Language: English
- Published: London
- Publisher: Verso Books
- Publication date: 2016
- Publication place: United Kingdom
- Pages: 218
- ISBN: 978-1-78478-075-3 (hardcover)
- Dewey Decimal: 306

The Ministry of Nostalgia is a 2016 book by British writer Owen Hatherley.

== Synopsis ==
The Ministry of Nostalgia argues that "our past is being resold in order to defend the indefensible". The book examines the so-called "austerity" of the 1940s and 1950s and argues that history has been "recast to offer consolation for the violence of neoliberalism, an ideology dedicated to the privatisation of our common wealth". The Ministry of Nostalgia questions "why should we have to keep calm and carry on?"

== Reception ==
In The Independent Marcus Tanner supports the conclusions of the book that "austerity" in the post-War UK was redistributive, with those on higher incomes paying more for the introduction of the welfare state.
