= Egg Banking =

British internet bank

Egg Banking plc
- Type: Subsidiary
- Industry: Finance and Insurance
- Founded: United Kingdom (1998)
- Defunct: July 2011
- Fate: Assets acquired
- Successor: Barclays; Yorkshire Building Society
- Headquarters: Derby, England, United Kingdom
- Products: Financial services
- Number of employees: 1,100
- Parent: Citigroup
- Website: www.egg.com

Egg was an internet bank headquartered in Derby, that is now a trading name of Yorkshire Building Society. Egg was born out of the banking arm in the United Kingdom of Prudential plc, which was established in 1996, and the Egg brand was launched in October 1998. The first online credit card was launched in September 1999.

It was only possible to operate an Egg account over the internet, or via their call centre. Egg specialised in savings and general insurance, together with loans, credit cards and mortgage products. The business was sold in January 2007 to Citigroup.

In March 2011, the credit card accounts were bought by Barclaycard, and in July 2011, the remaining savings and mortgage businesses were sold to Yorkshire Building Society, which subsequently transferred all remaining customer accounts over from Egg.

Following the sale of its assets, Egg Banking plc, which remained under the ownership of Citigroup, was renamed Canada Square Operations Limited and continues to handle matters relating to certain Egg products from before the sale of assets and any assets that were not transferred to the new owners.

== History ==
Egg was established as a division of life assurance company Prudential. Prudential Banking was involved in direct selling of savings and mortgage products.

On 11 October 1998, the division was renamed Egg, and relaunched as the United Kingdom's first Internet bank. The bank offered 8% savings interest, and the first credit card in the United Kingdom which offered a 0% interest rate on both new purchases and balance transfers, with an annual anniversary offer. As a result, Egg soon had more than two million customers enjoying these market leading rates.

In June 2000, Prudential cashed in on its stake, and floated 21% of the company on the London Stock Exchange, retaining 79%. In January 2004, Prudential announced its intention to sell its remaining stake in Egg to a third party. Paul Gratton was chief executive of Egg in 2001. Despite rumours of interest from the likes of Royal Bank of Scotland and HSBC, no formal offers were made public, and Prudential dropped its plans in August 2004.

Subsequently, Prudential bought back the remaining minority share in January 2006, and delisted the organisation from the London Stock Exchange. Chief executive officer Paul Gratton left the organisation in March 2006, to be replaced by then chief operating officer Mark Nancarrow. Nancarrow was subsequently replaced by Ian Kerr, formerly of HBOS, in November 2006.

On 29 January 2007, Prudential announced that it had agreed to sell Egg to Citigroup for a consideration of £575 million subject to approval by the Financial Services Authority. On 1 May 2007, the sale of Egg to Citi was completed, and Egg CEO Ian Kerr was appointed head of Egg and Citi UK Consumer.

At the beginning of 2008, Kerr left the business and was replaced in March by Bert Pijls. Pijls joined Citi in 1990, and has held several roles in the bank. In November 2007, approximately 350 non specialist roles were moved from the Dudley centre to Derby, resulting in redundancies and relocation packages. The Dudley office was later closed.

On 1 March 2011, Barclays Bank announced that they had agreed to buy Egg's more than one million credit card accounts from Citigroup. Barclay's Barclaycard division took over the Egg credit card business in May 2011, after Citi had spent time trying to sell the business as part of its Citi holdings portfolio.

Citi and Barclaycard shared the same site at Pride Park, Derby, but it was announced on 21 June 2011 that Barclaycard would move operations to their Kirkby and Northampton sites, leaving 659 people redundant. On 25 July 2011, Egg announced the proposed sale of all savings and mortgage accounts to Yorkshire Building Society. This would complete Citigroup's sale of the Egg business.

== Advertising ==
Egg used several advertising agencies to produce its advertising. These included CHI & Partners, Lowe Plus and Mother. Egg Card was launched in the United Kingdom with a television campaign by CHI and press advertisements and direct marketing created by Lowe Plus. Among the press advertisements was one showing a sea of urine samples with a headline that read 'We're just taking 10.9% APR. What's your card taking?'

== Egg France ==
Capitalising on its British success, Egg launched in France in November 2002 with La Carte Egg. Despite investing heavily in the market in France, the services were never popular with the French, who generally hold fewer credit cards than the British. In October 2004, Egg decided to close its French operations, selling the unsecured lending business to Banque Accord, and the savings and brokerage businesses to ING of the Netherlands.

== Controversies ==
On 2 February 2008, Egg chose to cancel the credit cards of 161,000 (7%) of its customers. The bank gave customers 35 days' notice, after which they would not be able to spend more on their cards. While publicised as an attempt to purge "risky" customers from their books, many affected customers came forward with claims that they had excellent credit histories.

This led to speculation that the move was an attempt to remove customers who did not accumulate interest on their accounts and therefore did not generate profit for the bank.

The Financial Services Authority fined Egg £721,000 in December 2008 for the persistent misselling of payment protection insurance (PPI) on its credit cards. The authority's director of enforcement, Margaret Cole, said "Egg used inappropriate sales techniques to try to persuade customers to buy payment protection insurance on their credit card, even when they asserted they did not want the cover."

During 2008, Egg attempted to have one of its customers imprisoned, saying the Chip and PIN cards were 'uncloneable', and the customer was 'clearly lying' about transactions from an ATM. The police arrested the customer, but after much investigation, the customer was acquitted.
