= Owen Hatherley =

British writer (born 1981)

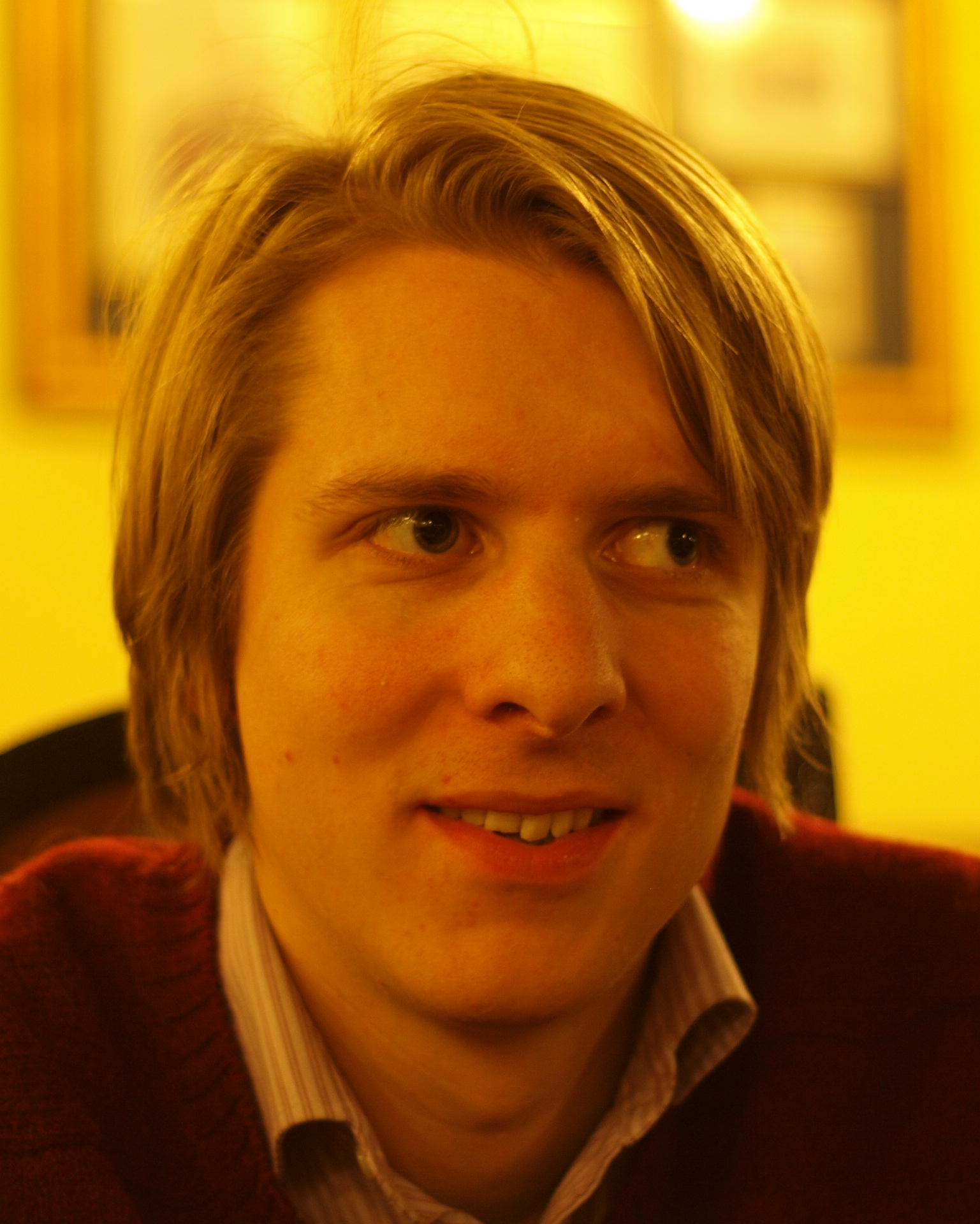
- Hatherley in 2009
- Born: 24 July 1981 (age 45); Southampton, Hampshire, England
- Education: Goldsmiths, University of London; Birkbeck, University of London
- Occupations: writer; author
- Owen Hatherley's voice
- Writing career
- Subjects: Architecture; left-wing politics; trade unionism
- Notable works: A Guide to the New Ruins of Great Britain; The Ministry of Nostalgia
- Scientific career
- Thesis: The Political Aesthetics of Americanism in Weimar Germany and the Soviet Union, 1919-34 (2011)
- Doctoral advisor: Esther Leslie
- Website: owenhatherley.co.uk

Owen Hatherley (born 24 July 1981) is a British writer and journalist based in London who writes primarily on architecture, politics and culture.

== Early life ==
Hatherley was born on 24 July 1981, in Southampton, growing up in a 1930s suburban estate. He describes his parents as "trots" who were members of Militant. At the age of 12, he moved to the Flowers Estate in Bassett Green, which he disliked, later saying: "I couldn't wait to get out of the sodding place, and the pitched roofs and front gardens didn’t exactly relieve the unpleasantness." When he was 16, he read England’s Dreaming by Jon Savage, which inspired him to move to London to study. He studied at Goldsmiths, University of London, graduating in 2001. He then received a PhD from Birkbeck, University of London in 2011. His supervisor was Esther Leslie.

== Writing ==
Hatherley started a blog, The Measures Taken, in 2005. He would go on to publish pieces elsewhere, including articles for Socialist Worker from 2006 to 2008, articles for New Humanist since 2007, and articles for Building Design from 2008 to 2014.

Hatherley's first book, Militant Modernism, was published by Zero Books in 2009. The Guardian described the book as an "intelligent and passionately argued attempt to 'excavate utopia' from the ruins of modernism" and an "exhilarating manifesto for a reborn socialist modernism". Icon described the book as "sparky, polemical and ferociously learned" although it "falters a little towards the end"; while Jonathan Meades in the New Statesman described the book as a "deflected Bildungsroman of a very clever, velvet-gloved provocateur nostalgic for yesterday's tomorrow, for a world made before he was born, a distant, preposterously optimistic world which, even though it still exists in scattered fragments, has had its meaning erased, its possibilities defiled" and Hatherley "as a commentator on architecture...in a school of one". The journal Planning Perspectives suggested that the book "nicely explores the irony of the potential status of the remains of future-oriented architecture and urban design as ‘modern heritage'".

His book A Guide to the New Ruins of Great Britain, which was based on a series of articles he wrote for Building Design, was published by Verso in 2010. Landscapes of Communism: A History Through Buildings, a history of communism in Europe told through the built environments of former socialist states, was published by Allen Lane in June 2015. In 2018, he released two books, Trans-Europe Express with Allen Lane, and The Adventures of Owen Hatherley in the Post-Soviet Space with Repeater Books.

Hatherley has written for Dezeen, Building Design, The Guardian, Icon, the London Review of Books, New Humanist, the New Statesman, Socialist Review, Socialist Worker, Dissent and Jacobin Magazine. He has maintained three blogs, Sit down man, you're a bloody tragedy, The Measures Taken and Kino Fist.

== Politics ==
Hatherley has described himself as a communist "at least in the sense in which the word was used in The Communist Manifesto". He wrote that "revolution might be a rather exciting thing, one that would transform the world, and transform space, for the better. Worth doing. Why not try it."

Amidst Russia's invasion of Ukraine, Hatherley argued that the political left must fully support Ukraine, writing, "Ukraine is a fake country only in the ways that all countries are fake, and it is real in the way that any others are real. It has the same right to exist and the same right to peace as any others."

== Bibliography ==
- Militant Modernism (Zero Books, 2009)
- A Guide to the New Ruins of Great Britain (Verso, 2010). ISBN 978-1-84467-700-9
- Uncommon: An Essay on Pulp (Zero Books, 2011)
- A New Kind of Bleak: Journeys through Urban Britain (Verso, 2012). ISBN 978-1-78168-075-9
- Across the Plaza: The Public Voids of the Post-Soviet City (Strelka Press, 2012)
- Landscapes of Communism (Allen Lane, 2015). ISBN 978-0-14-197589-4
- The Ministry of Nostalgia (Verso, 2016)
- The Chaplin Machine: Slapstick, Fordism and the Communist Avant-Garde (Pluto Press, 2016). ISBN 978-0-7453-3601-5
- Trans-Europe Express (Allen Lane, 2018). ISBN 978-0-14-199157-3
- The Adventures of Owen Hatherley in the Post-Soviet Space (Repeater Books, 2018). ISBN 978-1-912248-26-1
- Red Metropolis: Socialism and the Government of London (Repeater Books, 2020). ISBN 978-1-913462-20-8
- Editor of The Alternative Guide to the London Boroughs for Open House London (2020)
- Clean Living Under Difficult Circumstances (Verso, 2021). ISBN 978-1-83976-221-5
- Artificial Islands: Adventures in the Dominions (Repeater Books, 2022). ISBN 978-1-914420-86-3
- Ukrainian Postcards: A Limited eBook in Aid of Ukrainian Workers and Artists (Repeater Books, 2022). ISBN 978-1-914420-50-4
- Modern Buildings in Britain: A Gazetteer (Penguin, 2022). ISBN 978-0-241-53463-2
