= A Guide to the New Ruins of Great Britain =

Book by Owen Hatherley

- First edition
- Author: Owen Hatherley
- Language: English
- Subject: British architecture and urbanism, modern architecture, brutalist architecture
- Published: 2010 (Verso Books)
- Publication place: United Kingdom
- Media type: Print
- Pages: 400
- ISBN: 9781844676514

A Guide to the New Ruins of Great Britain is a book by the British writer Owen Hatherley, published by Verso Books in November 2010. The book is a critique of the architecture and urbanism of postmodern Britain, taking the form of a tour of British cities.

== Background ==
A Guide to the New Ruins of Great Britain is Hatherley's second book, following a quartet of essays entitled Militant Modernism published in 2008. Considerable overlap and repetition exists between the two works.

== Overview ==
Hatherley introduces A Guide to the New Ruins of Great Britain as "an autopsy of the urban renaissance", referring to a program initiated under Tony Blair and Gordon Brown and associated with the private finance initiative, city academies and the Commission for Architecture and the Built Environment. In his introduction, Hatherley quotes Karl Seitz's statement upon the opening of the Karl Marx-Hof in Vienna: "by these stones shall we be judged." Seitz's words, set in the context of the attack on the Karl Marx-Hof a year later by fascists fighting the Austrian Civil War, serve as guiding principles for the book. The book forms a catalogue raisonné of what the author describes as "pseudomodernism".

The journey, on which Hatherley was accompanied by photographer Joel Anderson, begins in Southampton, where Hatherley grew up, and takes in Milton Keynes, Nottingham, Manchester, Tyneside, Glasgow, Cambridge, several towns in Yorkshire, Cardiff, Liverpool and Greenwich. Hatherley focuses on the prior decade's programmes of regeneration and the remains of past civic improvements. In Cambridge, Hatherley reluctantly praises the Accordia development; while in Glasgow he describes BBC Pacific Quay as "decent, upstanding, moderate modernism" and praises buildings in the vicinity of Glasgow Central station; and in Tyneside he praises T. Dan Smith's desire to build a "Brasília of the North".

Hatherley most keenly explores the public and municipal architecture of the 1950s, 1960s and 1970s, including Thamesmead in Greenwich, Red Road in Glasgow, Park Hill in Sheffield and the Get Carter car park in Gateshead. Particular attention is paid to "the Former Socialist Republic of South Yorkshire", where Hatherley sees the promise of Socialist Brutalism having come closest to fulfilment. Hatherley criticises Bob Kerslake, the former chief executive of Sheffield City Council who presided over the demolition of council housing, and the Pathfinder scheme.

Hatherley's influences include Ian Nairn, Nikolaus Pevsner, J. B. Priestley's English Journey and Iain Sinclair.

== Critical reception ==
Patrick Wright, writing in Architecture Today, compares Hatherley's approach to that of William Cobbett, the 19th century agitator who criticised industrialisation in his Rural Rides; however, he points out that while Cobbett defended the British countryside, Hatherley is concerned with the urban Britain envisioned by post-war Modernist architects which he argues has fallen victim to regeneration schemes.

Rowan Moore, writing in The Observer, describes Hatherley as "not entirely fair" for his failure to grant a right of reply to those he criticises, the book's lack of input from the citizens and residents of the areas described, and its lack of any proposed alternative, but describes A Guide to the New Ruins of Great Britain as "essentially right: for all the talk of renewal, renaissance, regeneration and world-class architecture, and all the billions expended, our cities are, with some exceptions, more screwed up than they have ever been."

Will Self, reviewing Militant Modernism and A Guide to the New Ruins of Great Britain in the London Review of Books, describes the latter as "engaging and even stimulating", but argues that Hatherley fails to accept the deep-seated and philoprogenitive bad taste of the masses, instead favouring an ethic shaped by urban reductionism. Self also alleges similarities between Hatherley's argument regarding "pseudomodernism" and that of the architect Rem Koolhaas, whose work Hatherley criticises.
