= Barnsley Building Society =

Yorkshire Building Society trading as Barnsley Building Society
- Company type: Building Society (Mutual)
- Industry: Banking; Financial services
- Founded: 1853
- Defunct: July 2016
- Fate: Closed and rebranded under Yorkshire Building Society
- Headquarters: Barnsley, England, UK
- Key people: Edwin Baggott (Regional manager, BBS branches)
- Products: Savings, Mortgages, Investments, Loans, Credit Cards, Insurance
- Net income: £157 million GBP (December 2012)
- Total assets: £33.5 billion GBP (December 2012)
- Parent: Yorkshire Building Society
- Website: www.barnsley-bs.co.uk

Barnsley Building Society was established in January 1853 by a group of prominent townsfolk who, following the example of many other towns and cities at the time, decided to form their own building society.

The society became part of the Yorkshire Building Society in 2008, and has since continued as a trading division. In 2016, the Yorkshire announced it would replace the Barnsley Building Society brand with its own; closing six branches and rebranding the remainder under its own brand.

== History ==
=== Formation ===
The Barnsley Permanent Benefit Building Society was formed in January 1853 by "a few prominent townsmen". For the first three years it operated from a room in public buildings before moving to an office provided by James Taylor, a local druggist and Manager of the Society from 1854 to 1875. After ten years, in 1866, the Society moved to an office above a grocer's shop but it was not until 1890 that the Barnsley Permanent moved into its own purpose built premises at the corner of Regent Street and Royal Street in the town centre. During this period many rival terminating societies emerged as were the norm at the time, but due to its permanent nature the society began to dominate the local market for saving and mortgages. By the 1890s the society had opened branches at both Clayton West and Mexborough and saving balances started to grow more quickly.

The society opened its head office at Permanent Building on the corner of Regent Street and Church Street, Barnsley, in 1938. The newly built head office was opened by Henry Lascelles, 6th Earl of Harewood who at the time was president of the Yorkshire county association of building societies. By the 1950s the society's assets were strong and 15 branches existed, spreading from Blackpool in Lancashire to Dartford in Kent.

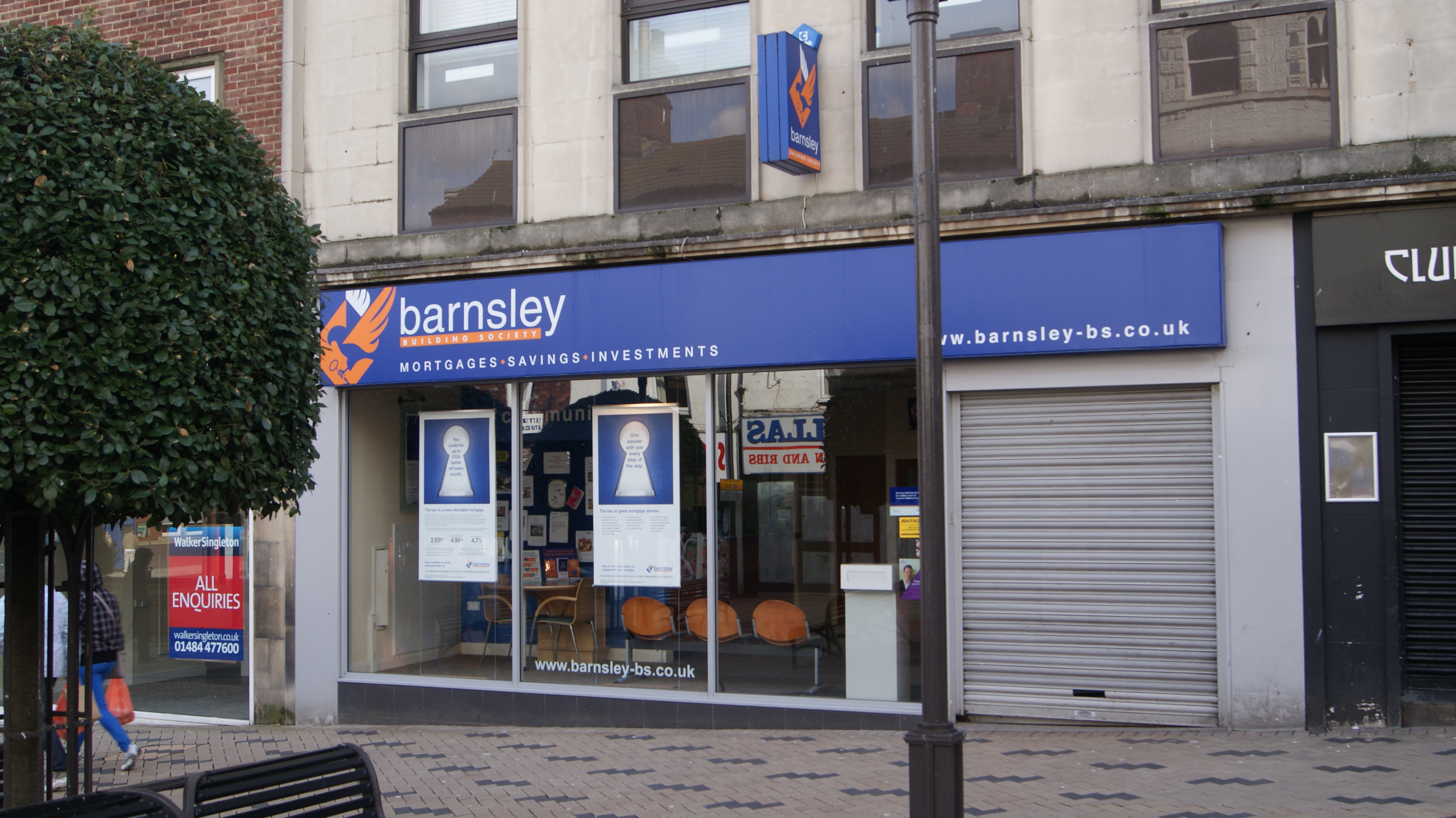
Barnsley Building Society, Wakefield.

=== Merger with the Yorkshire Building Society ===
In October 2008, the society announced that it expected to lose up to £10 million which it had deposited with Icelandic banks. In order to mitigate the situation, the Yorkshire Building Society agreed to take it over by the end of the year. The merger completed on 31 December 2008, at which point Barnsley Building Society became a trading name of Yorkshire Building Society. The Yorkshire expressed a desire to keep the Barnsley brand alive and run its eight branches as a separate trading brand; this being welcomed by many former Barnsley members and Barnsley staff. The merger was however somewhat controversial as several members of the FSA believed the merger was unnecessary as the Barnsley had substantial reserves to cover the losses. The board of the Barnsley however believed that in the uncertain times caused by the credit crunch the Barnsley's members would be better served by merging with the Yorkshire building Society. The Barnsley, despite its expected losses, was still a valuable commodity and it was rumoured several other societies were interested due to the Barnsley's strong mortgage book and funding streams which were in place without excessive lending from the money markets.

At the time of the merger, the society had 8 branches located at Barnsley, Cudworth, Chesterfield, Doncaster, Mexborough, Rotherham, Wakefield, and Wombwell as well as its Regent Street Head office. It was the 34th largest in the United Kingdom based on total assets of £376 million as at 31 December 2007.

In January 2016, it was announced that the Barnsley brand will be phased out by July. Six branches would be closed, with those that remain open being rebranded under the Yorkshire brand.
