= 2000–01 Cardiff City F.C. season =

Welsh football club season

Cardiff City
2000–01 season
- Owner: Sam Hammam
- Manager: Billy Ayre/Bobby Gould/Alan Cork
- Football League Third Division: 2nd
- FA Cup: 3rd round
- League Cup: 1st round
- FAW Premier Cup: Quarter-final
- LDV Vans Trophy: 1st round
- Top goalscorer: League: Robert Earnshaw (19); All: Robert Earnshaw (25)
- Highest home attendance: 13,602 (v Chesterfield, 16 April 2001)
- Lowest home attendance: 6,625 (v Mansfield, 21 October 2000)
- Average home league attendance: 7,962

The 2000–01 season was Cardiff City F.C.'s 74th season in the Football League. They competed in the 24-team Division Three, then the fourth tier of English football, finishing second, winning promotion to Division Two.

During the season the club was taken over by Lebanese businessman Sam Hammam, whose investment in the club would later see Cardiff win two promotions in the next four years.

== Players ==
Note: Flags indicate national team as defined under FIFA eligibility rules; some limited exceptions apply. Players may hold more than one non-FIFA nationality.

No.	Pos.	Nation	Player
2	DF	ENG	Andy Thompson
3	MF	ENG	Matt Brazier
4	DF	WAL	Scott Young
5	DF	ENG	Russell Perrett
7	MF	IRL	Willie Boland
8	MF	ENG	Mark Bonner
9	MF	WAL	Jason Bowen
10	FW	ENG	Kevin Nugent
11	DF	WAL	Andy Legg
12	DF	WAL	Rhys Weston
13	GK	WAL	Mark Walton
14	MF	ENG	Danny Hill
15	DF	ENG	Jeff Eckhardt
16	FW	WAL	Kurt Nogan
17	MF	ENG	Jason Fowler
18	FW	ENG	Paul Brayson

No.	Pos.	Nation	Player
19	FW	WAL	Robert Earnshaw
20	DF	WAL	Josh Low
21	FW	ENG	Gavin Gordon
22	DF	WAL	Danny Gabbidon
23	GK	ENG	Paul Buttery
24	MF	WAL	Gethin Jones
25	MF	WAL	Kevin Evans
26	DF	WAL	David Hughes
27	DF	SCO	Andy Jordan
28	DF	WAL	James Collins
29	FW	ENG	Leo Fortune-West
32	DF	WAL	Martyn Giles
41	GK	ENG	Carl Muggleton (on loan from Stoke City)
--	MF	ENG	Charlie Mapes
--	FW	ENG	Robert Codner

First team squad.

=== Left club during season ===
Note: Flags indicate national team as defined under FIFA eligibility rules; some limited exceptions apply. Players may hold more than one non-FIFA nationality.

No.	Pos.	Nation	Player
6	DF	ENG	David Greene (to Cambridge United)
26	MF	ENG	James Harper (on loan from Arsenal)

No.	Pos.	Nation	Player
28	FW	WAL	Dai Thomas (to Merthyr Tydfil)
31	FW	BER	Kyle Lightbourne (on loan from Stoke City)

== League table ==
Pos	Team	Pld	W	D	L	GF	GA	GD	Pts	Qualification or relegation
1	Brighton & Hove Albion (C, P)	46	28	8	10	73	35	+38	92	Promotion to Football League Second Division
2	Cardiff City (P)	46	23	13	10	95	58	+37	82	Promotion to Football League Second Division
3	Chesterfield (P)	46	25	14	7	79	42	+37	80 (Note: Chesterfield had 9 points deducted.)	Promotion to Football League Second Division
4	Hartlepool United	46	21	14	11	71	54	+17	77	Qualification for the Third Division play-offs
5	Leyton Orient	46	20	15	11	59	51	+8	75	Qualification for the Third Division play-offs

Rules for classification: 1) Points; 2) Goal difference; 3) Goals scored
(C) Champions; (P) Promoted

=== Results by round ===
Round	1	2	3	4	5	6	7	8	9	10	11	12	13	14	15	16	17	18	19	20	21	22	23	24	25	26	27	28	29	30	31	32	33	34	35	36	37	38	39	40	41	42	43	44	45	46
Ground	A	H	A	H	A	H	H	A	H	A	A	A	H	H	A	H	H	H	A	H	H	A	H	A	H	A	H	A	A	H	A	A	H	H	A	A	H	A	H	H	A	H	A	A	H	A
Result	W	D	D	D	D	D	W	W	D	L	L	D	W	W	D	W	W	W	W	W	W	L	W	D	W	W	D	L	L	W	W	W	W	D	L	W	W	L	W	W	L	D	D	L	W	L
Position	~	~	9	7	11	10	5	3	6	8	13	14	11	7	8	8	5	5	5	4	3	4	3	4	3	2	3	3	3	3	3	2	2	2	3	2	2	3	3	2	3	3	3	3	3	3
Points	3	4	5	6	7	8	11	14	15	15	15	16	19	22	23	26	29	32	35	38	41	41	44	45	48	51	52	52	52	55	58	61	64	65	65	68	71	71	74	77	77	78	79	79	82	82

A = Away; H = Home; W = Win; D = Draw; L = Loss

== Fixtures and results ==
=== Third Division ===
12 August 2000 1	Exeter City	1–2	Cardiff City	Exeter
	Graeme Tomlinson 48'		34' Paul Brayson; 62' Josh Low	Stadium: St James Park; Attendance: 3,929; Referee: Trevor Parkes (West Midlands)

19 August 2000 2	Cardiff City	1–1	Blackpool	Cardiff
15:00	Kevin Nugent 36'		90' John Murphy	Stadium: Ninian Park; Attendance: 11,019; Referee: Lee Cable (Woking)

26 August 2000 3	Barnet	2–2	Cardiff City	Chipping Barnet
	Scott McGleish 28'; Ken Charlery 81'		84' Josh Low; 90' Robert Earnshaw	Stadium: Underhill Stadium; Attendance: 2,264

28 August 2000 4	Cardiff City	2–2	Southend United	Cardiff
15:00	Kevin Nugent 4'; Paul Brayson 42'		54' Kevin Maher; 74' Neil Tolson; (yellow card) 64' (yellow-red card) 87' Neil Tolson	Stadium: Ninian Park; Attendance: 7,628; Referee: John Brandwood (Lichfield)

2 September 2000 5	Rochdale	1–1	Cardiff City	Rochdale
	Phil Hadland 81'		10' Paul Brayson	Stadium: Spotland; Attendance: 2,824; Referee: Mike Dean (Wirral)

9 September 2000 6	Cardiff City	1–1	Brighton & Hove Albion	Cardiff
15:00	Danny Hill 74'		59' Matthew Wicks	Stadium: Ninian Park; Attendance: 6,741; Referee: Guy Stretton (West Bridgford)

12 September 2000 7	Cardiff City	4–2	Halifax Town	Cardiff
19:45	Scott Young 5'; Jason Bowen 26'; Robert Earnshaw 32'; Leo Fortune-West 81'	BBC report	47' Craig Middleton; 77' Gary Jones	Stadium: Ninian Park; Attendance: 5,087; Referee: Ray Olivier (Sutton Coldfield)

16 September 2000 8	Scunthorpe United	0–2	Cardiff City	Scunthorpe
			70' Kevin Nugent; 72' Robert Earnshaw	Stadium: Glanford Park; Attendance: 3,263; Referee: Colin Webster (Tyne and Wear)

23 September 2000 9	Cardiff City	0–0	Kidderminster Harriers	Cardiff
15:00				Stadium: Ninian Park; Attendance: 8,003; Referee: Rob Styles (Dorset)

30 September 2000 10	Hull City	2–0	Cardiff City	Hull
	Danny Gabbidon 11' (o.g.); David Greene 69' (o.g.)		David Greene (red card) 71'	Stadium: Boothferry Park; Attendance: 5,503; Referee: David Laws (Tyne and Wear)

14 October 2000 11	Leyton Orient	2–1	Cardiff City	London
	Dean Smith 9'; Matt Lockwood 38' (pen.)		55' Leo Fortune-West	Stadium: Brisbane Road; Attendance: 4,649; Referee: Paul Robinson (East Yorkshire)

17 October 2000 12	Carlisle United	2–2	Cardiff City	London
	Stéphane Lemarchand 7'; Scott Dobie 35'		39' Andy Legg; 50' Kevin Nugent	Stadium: Brunton Park; Attendance: 1,309; Referee: Mark Cowburn (Lancashire)

21 October 2000 13	Cardiff City	2–0	Mansfield Town	Cardiff
15:00	Robert Earnshaw 52'; Paul Brayson 85'			Stadium: Ninian Park; Attendance: 4,625; Referee: Paul Armstrong (Berkshire)

24 October 2000 14	Cardiff City	2–0	Darlington	Cardiff
19:45	Robert Earnshaw 5'; Kevin Evans 90'			Stadium: Ninian Park; Attendance: 5,440; Referee: Mike Jones (Chester)

28 October 2000 15	Chesterfield	2–2	Cardiff City	Chesterfield
	Ryan Williams 54'; Luke Beckett 86'		24' Kevin Evans; 49' Jason Bowen	Stadium: Saltergate; Attendance: 5,378; Referee: George Cain (Bootle)

4 November 2000 16	Cardiff City	4–0	York City	Cardiff
15:00	Jason Bowen 2', 7'; Scott Young 41'; Robert Earnshaw 90'			Stadium: Ninian Park; Attendance: 6,101; Referee: Steve Tomlin (Lewes)

22 November 2000 17	Cardiff City	3–2	Lincoln City	Cardiff
19:45	Robert Earnshaw 5'; Paul Brayson 88'; Jason Barnett 90' (o.g.)		10', 40' Gavin Gordon	Stadium: Ninian Park; Attendance: 4,786; Referee: Phil Prosser (Tewkesbury)

25 November 2000 18	Cardiff City	3–2	Hartlepool United	Cardiff
15:00	Leo Fortune-West 20'; Mark Bonner 89'; Kurt Nogan 90'	BBC Report	17' Kevin Henderson; 89' Tommy Miller	Stadium: Ninian Park; Attendance: 6,251; Referee: Paul Rejer (Tipton)

2 December 2000 19	Torquay United	1–4	Cardiff City	Torquay
	Tony Bedeau 43'; Khalid Chalqi (red card)	BBC Report	46', 60', 71' Robert Earnshaw; 79' Paul Brayson	Stadium: Plainmoor; Attendance: 2,427; Referee: Paul Alcock (Surrey)

16 December 2000 20	Cardiff City	3–1	Cheltenham Town	Cardiff
15:00	Leo Fortune-West 31'; Robert Earnshaw 52'; Paul Brayson 80'	BBC Report	80' Martin Devaney; (red card) 48' Michael Duff	Stadium: Ninian Park; Attendance: 6,764; Referee: Phil Dowd (Stoke-on-Trent)

23 December 2000 21	Cardiff City	2–0	Macclesfield Town	Cardiff
15:00	Scott Young 6'; Jason Bowen 49'	BBC Report		Stadium: Ninian Park; Attendance: 8,088; Referee: Steve Dunn (Bristol)

26 December 2000 22	Plymouth Argyle	2–1	Cardiff City	Plymouth
	Sean McCarthy 74', 86'		15' Leo Fortune-West	Stadium: Home Park; Attendance: 8,543; Referee: David Crick (Kingston)

1 January 2001 23	Cardiff City	6–1	Exeter City	Cardiff
15:00	Scott Young 21'; Gavin Gordon 48'; Andy Legg 60'; Jason Bowen 63'; Matt Brazier 66'; Paul Brayson 87'	BBC Report	79' (o.g.) Andy Jordan	Stadium: Ninian Park; Attendance: 9,038; Referee: Anthony Bates (Stoke-on-Trent)

13 January 2001 24	Southend United	1–1	Cardiff City	Southend
	Rhys Weston 90' (o.g.)		45' Leo Fortune-West	Stadium: Roots Hall; Attendance: 4,601; Referee: Frazer Stretton

20 January 2001 25	Cardiff City	4–1	Plymouth Argyle	Cardiff
15:00	Robert Earnshaw 38', 88'; Leo Fortune-West 89'; Scott McCulloch 90'; James Harper (red card) 59'		51' Ian Stonebridge; Sean McCarthy (red card) 8'; Brian McGlinchey (yellow card) 55' (yellow-red card) 60'	Stadium: Ninian Park; Attendance: 9,157; Referee: Mark Cooper

27 January 2001 26	Macclesfield Town	2–5	Cardiff City	Macclesfield
	Kevin Keen 8'; Richard Tracey 55'		4' Jason Bowen; 43', 46' Scott Young; 49', 83' Robert Earnshaw	Stadium: Moss Rose; Attendance: 2,376; Referee: Bill Burns (Scarborough)

2 February 2001 27	Cardiff City	0–0	Rochdale	Cardiff
19:45				Stadium: Ninian Park; Attendance: 11,912; Referee: Bill Jordan (Hertfordshire)

10 February 2001 28	Brighton & Hove Albion	1–0	Cardiff City	Brighton
	Bobby Zamora 15'		(red card) 85' Gavin Gordon	Stadium: Falmer Stadium; Attendance: 6,922; Referee: Paul Armstrong (Berkshire)

13 February 2001 29	Blackpool	1–0	Cardiff City	Blackpool
	Brett Ormerod 50'			Stadium: Bloomfield Road; Attendance: 4,417; Referee: Trevor Parkes (West Midlands)

17 February 2001 30	Cardiff City	3–0	Scunthorpe United	Cardiff
15:00	Danny Gabbidon 35', 42'; Matt Brazier 61'			Stadium: Ninian Park; Attendance: 6,057; Referee: Keith Hill (Royston)

20 February 2001 31	Halifax Town	1–2	Cardiff City	Halifax
	Craig Middleton 64'	BBC Report	21', 52' Paul Brayson; Andy Legg (red card) 66'	Stadium: The Shay; Attendance: 1,991; Referee: Paul Danson (Leicester)

25 February 2001 32	Kidderminster Harriers	2–4	Cardiff City	Kidderminster
	Drewe Broughton 14', 90'		41' Scott Young; 45' Jason Bowen; 86' Danny Gabbidon; 90' Robert Earnshaw	Stadium: Aggborough Stadium; Attendance: 4,317; Referee: Phil Richards (Preston)

2 March 2001 33	Cardiff City	2–0	Hull City	Cardiff
19:45	Andy Legg 60'; Mike Edwards 75' (o.g.)	BBC Report	(yellow card) 8' (yellow-red card) 42' John Eyre	Stadium: Ninian Park; Attendance: 10,074; Referee: Michael Ryan (Preston)

6 March 2001 34	Cardiff City	1–1	Leyton Orient	Cardiff
19:45	Robert Earnshaw 89'		73' Sacha Opinel	Stadium: Ninian Park; Attendance: 9,022; Referee: Paul Durkin (Dorset)

10 March 2001 35	Lincoln City	2–0	Cardiff City	Lincoln
	Paul Smith 72'; Tony Battersby 79'			Stadium: Sincil Bank; Attendance: 4,451; Referee: Peter Walton (Northamptonshire)

13 March 2001 36	Shrewsbury Town	0–4	Cardiff City	Shrewsbury
	Nigel Jemson (yellow card) 44' (yellow-red card) 45'; Steve Jagielka (yellow card) 51' (yellow-red card) 72'	BBC Report	56' Josh Low; 64' Leo Fortune-West; 79' (pen.) Willie Boland; 82' Jason Bowen	Stadium: Gay Meadow; Attendance: 3,847; Referee: David Pugh (Bebington)

17 March 2001 37	Cardiff City	4–1	Carlisle United	Cardiff
15:00	Paul Brayson 2', 14'; Jason Bowen 44', 57'		90' Stephen Halliday	Stadium: Ninian Park; Attendance: 7,130; Referee: Guy Stretton (East Midlands)

1 April 2001 38	Cheltenham Town	3–1	Cardiff City	Cheltenham
	Neil Grayson 37', 41', 49'		6' Scott Young	Stadium: Whaddon Road; Attendance: 5,139; Referee: Chris Foy (Lancashire)

4 April 2001 39	Cardiff City	1–0	Barnet	Cardiff
19:45	Josh Low 69'			Stadium: Ninian Park; Attendance: 6,207; Referee: Eddie Wolstenholme (Lancashire)

7 April 2001 40	Cardiff City	2–1	Torquay United	Cardiff
15:00	Paul Brayson 80'; Leo Fortune-West 76'		31' David Graham	Stadium: Ninian Park; Attendance: 8,210; Referee: Mike Dean (Wirral)

14 April 2001 41	Darlington	2–0	Cardiff City	Darlington
	John Williams 12'; Glenn Naylor 28'	BBC Report		Stadium: Feethams; Attendance: 3,683; Referee: Alan Butler (Sutton-in-Ashfield)

16 April 2001 42	Cardiff City	3–3	Chesterfield	Cardiff
15:00	Paul Brayson 27', 49' (pen.); Kevin Evans 90'; Willie Boland (yellow card) 44' (yellow-red card) 89'	BBC Report	11' Steve Blatherwick; 42' Dave Reeves; 85' Luke Beckett	Stadium: Ninian Park; Attendance: 13,602; Referee: Andy Hall (West Midlands)

21 April 2001 43	York City	3–3	Cardiff City	York
	Chris Brass 41' (pen.); Lee Nogan 62'; Colin Alcide 67'		37', 45', 71' Leo Fortune-West	Stadium: Bootham Crescent; Attendance: 3,881; Referee: David Laws (Tyne and Wear)

24 April 2001 44	Mansfield Town	2–1	Cardiff City	Mansfield
	Shayne Bradley 6'; Chris Greenacre 82' (pen.)		66' Jason Bowen	Stadium: Field Mill; Attendance: 2,304; Referee: Ray Olivier (Sutton Coldfield)

28 April 2001 45	Cardiff City	3–1	Shrewsbury Town	Cardiff
15:00	Scott Young 11', 72'; Robert Earnshaw 72'		33' Nigel Jemson	Stadium: Ninian Park; Attendance: 12,188; Referee: Phil Dowd (Stoke-on-Trent)

5 May 2001 46	Hartlepool United	3–1	Cardiff City	Hartlepool
	Craig Midgley 33'; Tony Lormor 62'; Tommy Miller 83'	BBC Report	10' Robert Earnshaw; (yellow card) 87' (yellow-red card) 88' Scott McCulloch	Stadium: Victoria Park; Attendance: 5,324; Referee: Alan Butler (Sutton-in-Ashfield)

=== Worthington Cup (League Cup) ===
23 August 2000 Round 1 (First leg)	Crystal Palace	2–1	Cardiff City	London
	Clinton Morrison 19'; Neil Ruddock 34'	BBC Report	Scott Young	Stadium: Selhurst Park; Attendance: 5,983; Referee: Keith Hill (Royston)

5 September 2000 Round 1 (Second leg)	Cardiff City	0–0 (1–2 agg.)	Crystal Palace	Cardiff
19:45		BBC Report		Stadium: Ninian Park; Attendance: 4,904; Referee: Peter Walters (Bridgwater)

=== FA Cup ===
19 November 2000 Round 1	Cardiff City	5–1	Bristol Rovers	Cardiff
13:00	Robert Earnshaw 50', 78', 81'; Kevin Evans 15'; Leo Fortune-West 71'	BBC Report	8' (o.g.) Andy Jordan	Stadium: Ninian Park; Attendance: 8,013; Referee: Dermot Gallagher (Banbury)

9 December 2000 Round 2	Cardiff City	3–1	Cheltenham Town	Cardiff
15:00	Robert Earnshaw 31', 83' (pen.); Kevin Evans 37'		5' Russell Milton; Julian Alsop (red card) 40'	Stadium: Ninian Park; Attendance: 9,910; Referee: Mark Cowburn (Lancashire)

6 January 2001 Round 3	Cardiff City	1–1	Crewe Alexandra	Cardiff
15:00	Scott Young 62'	BBC Report	18' (o.g.) Jason Bowen	Stadium: Ninian Park; Attendance: 13,403; Referee: Mark Warren (Walsall)

16 January 2001 Round 3 (Replay)	Crewe Alexandra	2–1	Cardiff City	Crewe
19:45	Shaun Smith 10' (pen.); Mark Rivers 77'	BBC Report	37' Robert Earnshaw	Stadium: Gresty Road; Attendance: 5,785; Referee: Mark Warren (Walsall)

=== LDV Vans Trophy ===
5 December 2000 Round 1	Brighton & Hove Albion	2–0	Cardiff City	Brighton
	Lee Johnson 13'; Danny Cullip 20'	BBC Report		Stadium: Withdean Stadium; Attendance: 2,364; Referee: Mike North (Wimborne)

=== FAW Premier Cup ===
3 October 2000 Group B	Cardiff City	1–0	Cwmbran	Cardiff
19:15	Kurt Nogan			Stadium: Ninian Park; Attendance: 1,503

10 October 2000 Group B	Cardiff City	2–1	Merthyr Tydfil	Cardiff
19:15	Andy Legg; Danny Hill		Chris Summers	Stadium: Ninian Park; Attendance: 1,412

31 October 2000 Group B	Llanelli	2–3	Cardiff City	Llanelli
	Mark Dickeson; Mark Dickeson		(pen.) Scott McCulloch; Kurt Nogan; Leo Fortune-West	Stadium: Stebonheath Park; Attendance: 420

28 November 2000 Group B	Cardiff City	2–1	Llanelli	Cardiff
19:15	Kurt Nogan; Gary Davies (o.g.)		Nicky Palmer	Stadium: Ninian Park; Attendance: 1,012

9 January 2001 Group B	Merthyr Tydfil	0–2	Cardiff City	Merthyr Tydfil
			Kurt Nogan; Kurt Nogan	Stadium: Penydarren Park; Attendance: 630

30 January 2001 Group B	Cwmbran	0–2	Cardiff City	Cardiff
			(o.g.) Kurt Betties; Gavin Gordon	Stadium: Ninian Park; Attendance: 1,264

20 March 2001 Quarter Final	Merthyr Tydfil	1–0	Cardiff City	Merthyr Tydfil
18:55	Justin Perry			Stadium: Penydarren Park; Attendance: 486; Referee: JA Collins (Swansea)

== See also ==
- List of Cardiff City F.C. seasons

== Bibliography ==
- Hayes, Dean (2006). The Who's Who of Cardiff City. Breedon Books. ISBN 1-85983-462-0.
- Shepherd, Richard (2002). The Definitive Cardiff City F.C. Tony Brown. ISBN 1-899-46817-X.
- Crooks, John (1992). Cardiff City Football Club: Official History of the Bluebirds. Yore Publications. ISBN 0-9513321-8-X.
- Rollin, Glenda; Rollin, Jack, eds. (2001). Rothmans Football Yearbook 2001-2002. Headline Book Publishing. ISBN 0-7472-7260-3.
- "Football Club History Database – Cardiff City".
- Welsh Football Data Archive
