= 2001–02 Cardiff City F.C. season =

Welsh football club season

Cardiff City
2001–02 season
- Chairman: Sam Hammam
- Manager: Alan Cork; Lennie Lawrence
- Division Two: 4th
- FA Cup: Fourth round
- League Cup: First round
- LDV Vans Trophy: Second round
- FAW Premier Cup: Winners
- Top goalscorer: League: Graham Kavanagh (13); All: Graham Kavanagh (16)
- Highest home attendance: 22,009 vs Leeds United (6 January 2002)
- Lowest home attendance: 2,052 vs Rushden & Diamonds (16 September 2001)
- Average home league attendance: 12,522

During the 2001–02 season Cardiff City played in the Football League Division Two. They finished in fourth place before losing to Stoke City in the play-off semi finals after extra time in the second leg.

== Squad ==
| No. | Pos | Nat | Player | Total | | Championship | | FA Cup | | League Cup | | Other | |
| No. | Pos | Nat | Player | Apps | Goals | Apps | Goals | Apps | Goals | Apps | Goals | Apps | Goals |
|---|---|---|---|---|---|---|---|---|---|---|---|---|---|
| 1 | GK | (Scotland) SCO | Neil Alexander | 53 | 0 | 48 | 0 | 4 | 0 | 1 | 0 | 0 | 0 |
| 2 | DF | (Wales) WAL | Rhys Weston | 44 | 0 | 39 | 0 | 3 | 0 | 1 | 0 | 1 | 0 |
| 3 | DF | (Wales) WAL | Andy Legg | 41 | 2 | 35 | 2 | 4 | 0 | 1 | 0 | 1 | 0 |
| 4 | DF | (England) ENG | Des Hamilton | 24 | 0 | 19 | 0 | 2 | 0 | 0 | 0 | 3 | 0 |
| 5 | DF | (England) ENG | Spencer Prior | 44 | 2 | 39 | 2 | 3 | 0 | 0 | 0 | 2 | 0 |
| 6 | DF | (Wales) WAL | Danny Gabbidon | 49 | 3 | 44 | 3 | 4 | 0 | 1 | 0 | 0 | 0 |
| 7 | MF | (Wales) WAL | Josh Low | 27 | 0 | 22 | 0 | 1 | 0 | 1 | 0 | 3 | 0 |
| 8 | MF | (Republic of Ireland) IRL | Graham Kavanagh | 51 | 16 | 45 | 13 | 4 | 2 | 1 | 0 | 1 | 1 |
| 9 | FW | (England) ENG | Leo Fortune-West | 46 | 11 | 38 | 10 | 4 | 1 | 1 | 0 | 3 | 0 |
| 10 | FW | (Wales) WAL | Robert Earnshaw | 36 | 15 | 32 | 12 | 3 | 2 | 1 | 1 | 0 | 0 |
| 11 | FW | (Wales) WAL | Jason Bowen | 29 | 5 | 26 | 5 | 2 | 0 | 0 | 0 | 1 | 0 |
| 12 | MF | (Republic of Ireland) IRL | Willie Boland | 50 | 1 | 44 | 1 | 4 | 0 | 1 | 0 | 1 | 0 |
| 13 | GK | (Wales) WAL | Mark Walton | 3 | 0 | 0 | 0 | 0 | 0 | 0 | 0 | 3 | 0 |
| 14 | FW | (Wales) WAL | Paul Brayson | 41 | 4 | 35 | 3 | 4 | 1 | 1 | 0 | 1 | 0 |
| 15 | MF | (England) ENG | Mark Bonner | 37 | 0 | 31 | 0 | 4 | 0 | 0 | 0 | 2 | 0 |
| 16 | DF | (Wales) WAL | David Hughes | 7 | 0 | 2 | 0 | 0 | 0 | 1 | 0 | 4 | 0 |
| 17 | DF | (Scotland) SCO | Andy Jordan | 0 | 0 | 0 | 0 | 0 | 0 | 0 | 0 | 0 | 0 |
| 18 | DF | (Wales) WAL | Scott Young | 40 | 5 | 35 | 4 | 3 | 1 | 0 | 0 | 2 | 0 |
| 19 | MF | (England) ENG | Michael Simpkins | 19 | 0 | 17 | 0 | 0 | 0 | 1 | 0 | 1 | 0 |
| 20 | FW | (England) ENG | Gavin Gordon | 19 | 8 | 15 | 2 | 2 | 1 | 1 | 0 | 1 | 5 |
| 21 | GK | (Wales) WAL | Lee Kendall | 1 | 0 | 0 | 0 | 0 | 0 | 0 | 0 | 1 | 0 |
| 22 | FW | (England) ENG | Kevin Nugent | 3 | 1 | 1 | 0 | 0 | 0 | 0 | 0 | 2 | 1 |
| 22 | FW | (England) ENG | Andy Campbell | 10 | 7 | 10 | 7 | 0 | 0 | 0 | 0 | 0 | 0 |
| 23 | MF | (Wales) WAL | Leyton Maxwell | 23 | 1 | 18 | 1 | 1 | 0 | 0 | 0 | 4 | 0 |
| 24 | MF | (Wales) WAL | Gethin Jones | 1 | 1 | 0 | 0 | 0 | 0 | 0 | 0 | 1 | 1 |
| 25 | MF | (Wales) WAL | Martyn Giles | 2 | 0 | 0 | 0 | 0 | 0 | 0 | 0 | 2 | 0 |
| 26 | MF | (Wales) WAL | Kevin Evans | 0 | 0 | 0 | 0 | 0 | 0 | 0 | 0 | 0 | 0 |
| 27 | DF | (Wales) WAL | James Collins | 15 | 2 | 8 | 1 | 2 | 0 | 0 | 0 | 5 | 1 |
| 28 | DF | (England) ENG | Andy Thompson | 2 | 0 | 0 | 0 | 0 | 0 | 0 | 0 | 2 | 0 |
| 28 | DF | (England) ENG | Gary Croft | 8 | 1 | 8 | 1 | 0 | 0 | 0 | 0 | 0 | 0 |
| 29 | FW | (Wales) WAL | Kurt Nogan | 0 | 0 | 0 | 0 | 0 | 0 | 0 | 0 | 0 | 0 |
| 30 | MF | (England) ENG | Jason Fowler | 0 | 0 | 0 | 0 | 0 | 0 | 0 | 0 | 0 | 0 |
| 30 | DF | (Wales) WAL | Ceri Hughes | 0 | 0 | 0 | 0 | 0 | 0 | 0 | 0 | 0 | 0 |
| 31 | DF | (England) ENG | Matt Brazier | 1 | 0 | 0 | 0 | 0 | 0 | 0 | 0 | 1 | 0 |
| 31 | GK | (England) ENG | Stephen Bywater | 0 | 0 | 0 | 0 | 0 | 0 | 0 | 0 | 0 | 0 |
| 32 | DF | (England) ENG | Russell Perrett | 0 | 0 | 0 | 0 | 0 | 0 | 0 | 0 | 0 | 0 |
| 32 | FW | (England) ENG | Peter Thorne | 28 | 8 | 28 | 8 | 0 | 0 | 0 | 0 | 0 | 0 |
| 33 | DF | (Scotland) SCO | Scott McCulloch | 1 | 0 | 0 | 0 | 0 | 0 | 0 | 0 | 1 | 0 |
| 34 | MF | (Wales) WAL | Leon Jeanne | 4 | 1 | 2 | 0 | 0 | 0 | 0 | 0 | 2 | 1 |
| 35 | DF | (Wales) WAL | Byron Anthony | 0 | 0 | 0 | 0 | 0 | 0 | 0 | 0 | 0 | 0 |
| 36 | MF | (Wales) WAL | Nicky Fish | 0 | 0 | 0 | 0 | 0 | 0 | 0 | 0 | 0 | 0 |
| 37 | DF | (England) ENG | Dean Gordon | 7 | 1 | 7 | 1 | 0 | 0 | 0 | 0 | 0 | 0 |

== Standings ==
| Pos | Team | Pld | W | D | L | GF | GA | GD | Pts | Promotion or relegation |
|---|---|---|---|---|---|---|---|---|---|---|
| 2 | Reading (P) | 46 | 23 | 15 | 8 | 70 | 43 | +27 | 84 | Promotion to Football League First Division |
| 3 | Brentford | 46 | 24 | 11 | 11 | 77 | 43 | +34 | 83 | Qualification for the Second Division play-offs |
| 4 | Cardiff City | 46 | 23 | 14 | 9 | 75 | 50 | +25 | 83 | Qualification for the Second Division play-offs |
| 5 | Stoke City (O, P) | 46 | 23 | 11 | 12 | 67 | 40 | +27 | 80 | Qualification for the Second Division play-offs |
| 6 | Huddersfield Town | 46 | 21 | 15 | 10 | 65 | 47 | +18 | 78 | Qualification for the Second Division play-offs |

Rules for classification: In the Football League goals scored (GF) takes precedence over goal difference (GD).
(O) Play-off winners; (P) Promoted

=== Results by round ===
| Round | 1 | 2 | 3 | 4 | 5 | 6 | 7 | 8 | 9 | 10 | 11 | 12 | 13 | 14 | 15 | 16 | 17 | 18 | 19 | 20 | 21 | 22 | 23 | 24 | 25 | 26 | 27 | 28 | 29 | 30 | 31 | 32 | 33 | 34 | 35 | 36 | 37 | 38 | 39 | 40 | 41 | 42 | 43 | 44 | 45 | 46 |
|---|---|---|---|---|---|---|---|---|---|---|---|---|---|---|---|---|---|---|---|---|---|---|---|---|---|---|---|---|---|---|---|---|---|---|---|---|---|---|---|---|---|---|---|---|---|---|
| Ground | H | A | H | A | A | H | H | A | H | A | H | A | A | H | A | A | H | H | A | H | H | A | A | H | H | H | A | H | A | A | H | A | A | H | H | A | H | H | A | H | A | H | A | A | H | A |
| Result | W | D | D | W | L | W | L | L | D | D | D | W | W | D | W | L | W | D | D | W | W | D | D | D | L | L | W | W | L | W | W | L | L | W | W | W | D | D | W | W | W | W | W | D | W | W |
| Position | ~ | 7 | 11 | 9 | 13 | 11 | 15 | 17 | 17 | 17 | 17 | 15 | 14 | 15 | 10 | 11 | 8 | 8 | 10 | 9 | 5 | 6 | 5 | 6 | 10 | 12 | 10 | 10 | 10 | 10 | 8 | 8 | 11 | 8 | 7 | 8 | 8 | 8 | 7 | 6 | 6 | 6 | 5 | 4 | 4 | 4 |
| Points | 3 | 4 | 5 | 8 | 8 | 11 | 11 | 11 | 12 | 13 | 14 | 17 | 20 | 21 | 24 | 24 | 27 | 28 | 29 | 32 | 35 | 36 | 37 | 38 | 38 | 38 | 41 | 44 | 44 | 47 | 50 | 50 | 50 | 53 | 56 | 59 | 60 | 61 | 64 | 67 | 70 | 73 | 76 | 77 | 80 | 83 |

A = Away; H = Home; W = Win; D = Draw; L = Loss

== Fixtures and results ==
=== Division Two ===
| 11 August 2001 1 | Cardiff City | 1–0 | Wycombe Wanderers | Cardiff |
| 15:00 | Danny Gabbidon 17' | | | Stadium: Ninian Park; Attendance: 17,403; Referee: Phil Dowd (Stoke-on-Trent) |

| 18 August 2001 2 | Peterborough United | 1–1 | Cardiff City | Peterborough |
| 15:00 | David Farrell 44' | | 18' Graham Kavanagh | Stadium: London Road; Attendance: 6,437; Referee: Steve Baines (Derbyshire) |

| 25 August 2001 3 | Cardiff City | 2–2 | Bournemouth | Cardiff |
| 15:00 | Leo Fortune-West 39'; Robert Earnshaw 49' | | 62' (pen.) Warren Feeney; 65' Jason Tindall | Stadium: Ninian Park; Attendance: 13,383; Referee: Mick Fletcher (Worcestershire) |

| 8 September 2001 4 | Reading | 1–2 | Cardiff City | Reading |
| 15:00 | Alex Smith 32' | | 13', 36' Leo Fortune-West | Stadium: Madejski Stadium; Attendance: 13,017; Referee: Dennis Pugh (Chester) |

| 15 September 2001 5 | Cambridge United | 2–1 | Cardiff City | Cambridge |
| 15:00 | Dave Kitson 15'; Paul Wanless 71' | | 90' Andy Legg | Stadium: Abbey Stadium; Attendance: 3,454; Referee: Guy Stretton (West Bridgford) |

| 18 September 2001 6 | Cardiff City | 2–0 | Northampton Town | Cardiff |
| | Graham Kavanagh 28'; Paul Brayson 72' (pen.) | | | Stadium: Ninian Park; Attendance: 11,232; Referee: Trevor Parkes (West Midlands) |

| 22 September 2001 7 | Cardiff City | 1–2 | Huddersfield Town | Cardiff |
| 15:00 | Peter Thorne 8' | | 20' Dwayne Mattis; 56' Danny Schofield | Stadium: Ninian Park; Attendance: 12,280; Referee: John Brandwood (Lichfield) |

| 25 September 2001 8 | Queens Park Rangers | 2–1 | Cardiff City | London |
| | Andy Thompson 54' (pen.), 61' | | 38' (pen.) Graham Kavanagh | Stadium: Loftus Road; Attendance: 11,667; Referee: Matt Messias (Yorkshire) |

| 29 September 2001 9 | Cardiff City | 1–1 | Brighton & Hove Albion | Cardiff |
| 15:00 | Paul Brayson 79' | | 36' Bobby Zamora | Stadium: Ninian Park; Attendance: 12,002; Referee: Mark Warren (Walsall) |

| 9 October 2001 10 | Bristol City | 1–1 | Cardiff City | Bristol |
| | Mickey Bell 56' | | 45' (pen.) Robert Earnshaw | Stadium: Ashton Gate; Attendance: 13,804; Referee: Rob Harris (Oxfordshire) |

| 12 October 2001 11 | Cardiff City | 2–2 | Wigan Athletic | Cardiff |
| | Peter Thorne 53'; Paul Brayson 84' | | 17' Pat McGibbon; 52' Simon Haworth | Stadium: Ninian Park; Attendance: 11,072; Referee: Richard Beeby (Northampton) |

| 21 October 2001 12 | Swindon Town | 0–3 | Cardiff City | Swindon |
| 14:15 | | | 36' Robert Earnshaw; 46' Jason Bowen; 80' Graham Kavanagh | Stadium: County Ground; Attendance: 8,373; Referee: Chris Foy (Lancashire) |

| 24 October 2001 13 | Port Vale | 0–2 | Cardiff City | Port Vale |
| | | | 19' Spencer Prior; 34' Robert Earnshaw | Stadium: Vale Park; Attendance: 4,552; Referee: Steve Dunn (Bristol) |

| 27 October 2001 14 | Cardiff City | 1–1 | Tranmere Rovers | Cardiff |
| 15:00 | Jason Bowen 39' | | 90' Paul Rideout | Stadium: Ninian Park; Attendance: 13,070; Referee: Anthony Bates (Stoke-on-Trent) |

| 4 November 2001 15 | Wrexham | 1–3 | Cardiff City | Wrexham |
| 14:15 | Carlos Edwards 5' | | 33' Gavin Gordon; 45' Graham Kavanagh; 55' Leo Fortune-West | Stadium: The Racecourse; Attendance: 5,832; Referee: Scott Mathieson (Cheshire) |

| 7 November 2001 16 | Bury | 3–0 | Cardiff City | Bury |
| | Jason Jarrett 10'; Gareth Seddon 52'; David Borley 79' | | | Stadium: Gigg Lane; Attendance: 2,549; Referee: Graham Frankland (Middlesbrough) |

| 10 November 2001 17 | Cardiff City | 2–1 | Chesterfield | Cardiff |
| 15:00 | Robert Earnshaw 4' (pen.); Leo Fortune-West 24' | | 45' David D'Auria | Stadium: Ninian Park; Attendance: 9,516; Referee: Paul Rejer (Staffordshire) |

| 20 November 2001 18 | Cardiff City | 1–1 | Colchester United | Cardiff |
| | James Collins 33' | | 87' Joe Dunne | Stadium: Ninian Park; Attendance: 8,013; Referee: Clive Wilkes (Oxford) |

| 24 November 2001 19 | Notts County | 0–0 | Cardiff City | Nottingham |
| 15:00 | | | | Stadium: Meadow Lane; Attendance: 6,313; Referee: Howard Webb (Yorkshire) |

| 1 December 2001 20 | Cardiff City | 3–1 | Oldham Athletic | Cardiff |
| 15:00 | Robert Earnshaw 37'; Graham Kavanagh 74', 90' | | 75' John Eyre | Stadium: Ninian Park; Attendance: 10,004; Referee: Ray Olivier (Sutton Coldfield) |

| 4 December 2001 21 | Cardiff City | 3–1 | Brentford | Cardiff |
| | Peter Thorne 15'; Robert Earnshaw 36'; Danny Gabbidon 75' | | 69' Paul Evans | Stadium: Ninian Park; Attendance: 10,154; Referee: Adrian Hall (Birmingham) |

| 15 December 2001 22 | Blackpool | 1–1 | Cardiff City | Blackpool |
| 15:00 | John Hills 66' | | 68' Dean Gordon | Stadium: Bloomfield Road; Attendance: 4,880; Referee: Mike Pike (Cumbria) |

| 19 December 2001 23 | Stoke City | 1–1 | Cardiff City | Stoke |
| | Danny Gabbidon 77' (o.g.) | | 83' Dean Gordon | Stadium: Britannia Stadium; Attendance: 14,331; Referee: Tony Leake (Hertfordshire) |

| 26 December 2001 24 | Cardiff City | 2–2 | Reading | Cardiff |
| 12:00 | Robert Earnshaw 29', 67' | | 56' Nicky Forster; 78' John Salako | Stadium: Ninian Park; Attendance: 16,708; Referee: Dermot Gallagher (Oxfordshire) |

| 29 December 2001 25 | Cardiff City | 1–3 | Bristol City | Cardiff |
| 15:00 | Graham Kavanagh 47' | | 56', 58' Scott Murray; 60' Lee Matthews | Stadium: Ninian Park; Attendance: 16,149; Referee: Paul Durkin (Dorset) |

| 12 January 2002 26 | Cardiff City | 0–2 | Peterborough United | Cardiff |
| 15:00 | | | 45' Leon McKenzie; 54' Neale Fenn | Stadium: Ninian Park; Attendance: 11,301; Referee: Mark Warren (Walsall) |

| 19 January 2002 27 | Wycombe Wanderers | 0–1 | Cardiff City | High Wycombe |
| 15:00 | | | 67' Graham Kavanagh | Stadium: Adams Park; Attendance: 7,165; Referee: Joe Ross (Essex) |

| 22 January 2002 28 | Cardiff City | 2–0 | Stoke City | Cardiff |
| | Bjarni Gudjonsson 19' (o.g.); Andy Legg 71' | | | Stadium: Ninian Park; Attendance: 11,771; Referee: Uriah Rennie (South Yorkshire) |

| 31 January 2002 29 | Brighton & Hove Albion | 1–0 | Cardiff City | Brighton |
| | Bobby Zamora 14' (pen.) | | | Stadium: Withdean Stadium; Attendance: 6,117; Referee: Lee Cable (Woking) |

| 5 February 2002 30 | Bournemouth | 1–3 | Cardiff City | Bournemouth |
| | Derek Holmes 73' | | 15' Graham Kavanagh; 21' Robert Earnshaw; 52' Willie Boland | Stadium: Dean Court; Attendance: 4,336; Referee: David Crick (Surrey) |

| 9 February 2002 31 | Cardiff City | 3–0 | Swindon Town | Cardiff |
| 15:00 | Robert Earnshaw 19'; Jason Bowen 71', 82' | | | Stadium: Ninian Park; Attendance: 12,045; Referee: Phil Dowd (Stoke-on-Trent) |

| 12 February 2002 32 | Brentford | 2–1 | Cardiff City | London |
| 19:45 | Stephen Hunt 54'; Ben Burgess 78' | | 18' Jason Bowen | Stadium: Griffin Park; Attendance: 6,718; Referee: Steve Bennett (Kent) |

| 16 February 2002 33 | Wigan Athletic | 4–0 | Cardiff City | Wigan |
| 15:00 | Lee McCulloch 2'; Jason De Vos 16', 52'; Arjan De Zeeuw 67' | | | Stadium: JJB Stadium; Attendance: 5,487; Referee: Bill Jordan (Hertfordshire) |

| 19 February 2002 34 | Cardiff City | 1–0 | Bury | Cardiff |
| 19:45 | Graham Kavanagh 43' (pen.) | | | Stadium: Ninian Park; Attendance: 8,273; Referee: Phil Prosser (West Yorkshire) |

| 23 February 2002 35 | Cardiff City | 2–0 | Cambridge United | Cardiff |
| | Graham Kavanagh 36', 62' (pen.) | | | Stadium: Ninian Park; Attendance: 10,182; Referee: Paul Taylor (Middlesex) |

| 2 March 2002 36 | Northampton Town | 1–2 | Cardiff City | Northampton |
| | Marco Gabbiadini 35' | | 32' Leyton Maxwell; 37' Andy Campbell | Stadium: County Ground; Attendance: 5,495; Referee: Steve Bennett (Kent) |

| 5 March 2002 37 | Cardiff City | 1–1 | Queens Park Rangers | Cardiff |
| | Scott Young 59' | | 12' Richard Pacquette | Stadium: Ninian Park; Attendance: 13,425; Referee: George Cain (Bootle, Merseyside) |

| 9 March 2002 38 | Cardiff City | 2–2 | Blackpool | Cardiff |
| | Andy Campbell 30', 66' | | 19', 27' John Murphy | Stadium: Ninian Park; Attendance: 11,629; Referee: Clive Penton (Sussex) |

| 16 March 2002 39 | Oldham Athletic | 1–7 | Cardiff City | Oldham |
| | Stuart Balmer 74' | | 6' Scott Young; 22', 45' Leo Fortune-West; 23' Peter Thorne; 30', 64', 73' Andy Campbell | Stadium: Boundary Park; Attendance: 6,786; Referee: Colin Webster (Tyne and Wear) |

| 22 March 2002 40 | Cardiff City | 3–2 | Wrexham | Cardiff |
| 19:45 | Scott Young 14'; Peter Thorne 17'; Danny Gabbidon 47' | | 34' Craig Faulconbridge; 88' Hector Sam | Stadium: Ninian Park; Attendance: 15,702; Referee: Peter Walton (Northamptonshire) |

| 30 March 2002 41 | Chesterfield | 0–2 | Cardiff City | Chesterfield |
| | | | 6' Leo Fortune-West; 30' Andy Campbell | Stadium: Saltergate; Attendance: 5,442; Referee: Mark Clattenburg (Durham) |

| 1 April 2002 42 | Cardiff City | 1–0 | Port Vale | Cardiff |
| | Peter Thorne 74' | | | Stadium: Ninian Park; Attendance: 15,556; Referee: Phil Richards (Preston) |

| 6 April 2002 43 | Colchester United | 0–1 | Cardiff City | Colchester |
| | | | 20' Spencer Prior | Stadium: Layer Road; Attendance: 3,970; Referee: Paul Danson (Leicester) |

| 9 April 2002 44 | Huddersfield Town | 2–2 | Cardiff City | Huddersfield |
| | Kenny Irons 79' (pen.); Chris Hay 82' | | 39', 62' Peter Thorne | Stadium: Kirklees Stadium; Attendance: 11,660; Referee: Graham Laws (Northumberland) |

| 13 April 2002 45 | Cardiff City | 2–1 | Notts County | Cardiff |
| | Leo Fortune-West 52'; Scott Young 78' | | 12' Richard Liburd | Stadium: Ninian Park; Attendance: 17,105; Referee: Paul Rejer (Staffordshire) |

| 20 April 2002 46 | Tranmere Rovers | 0–1 | Cardiff City | Birkenhead |
| | | | 72' Gary Croft | Stadium: Prenton Park; Attendance: 8,375; Referee: Roy Pearson (Durham) |

=== Play-offs ===
| 28 April 2002 First Leg | Stoke City | 1–2 | Cardiff City | Stoke |
| | Deon Burton 84' | | 12' Robert Earnshaw; 59' Leo Fortune-West | Stadium: Britannia Stadium; Attendance: 21,245; Referee: Tony Leake (Hertfordshire) |

| 1 May 2002 Second Leg | Cardiff City | 0–2 (a.e.t.) (2–3 agg.) | Stoke City | Cardiff |
| | | | 90' James O'Connor; 115' Souleymane Oulare | Stadium: Ninian Park; Attendance: 19,367; Referee: Mike Dean (Wirral) |

=== FA Cup ===
| 17 November 2001 Round 1 | Tiverton | 1–3 | Cardiff City | Cardiff |
| 15:00 | Kevin Nancekivell 82' | | 34' Paul Brayson; 55' Des Hamilton; 74' Robert Earnshaw | Stadium: Ninian Park; Attendance: 6,648; Referee: Anthony Bates (Stoke-on-Trent) |

| 8 December 2001 Round 2 | Cardiff City | 3–0 | Port Vale | Cardiff |
| 15:00 | Robert Earnshaw 26'; Gavin Gordon 49'; Leo Fortune-West 74' | | | Stadium: Ninian Park; Attendance: 9,650; Referee: Peter Walton (Northamptonshire) |

| 6 January 2002 Round 3 | Cardiff City | 2–1 | Leeds United | Cardiff |
| 16:00 | Graham Kavanagh 21'; Scott Young 87' | | 12' Mark Viduka | Stadium: Ninian Park; Attendance: 22,009; Referee: Andy D'Urso (Billericay) |

| 27 January 2002 Round 4 | Tranmere Rovers | 3–1 | Cardiff City | Birkenhead |
| 13:00 | Paul Rideout 23'; Sean Flynn 53'; Jason Koumas 79' | | 21' (pen.) Graham Kavanagh | Stadium: Prenton Park; Attendance: 9,442; Referee: Alan Kaye (West Yorkshire) |

- – Tiverton Town were drawn as the home side but the match was switched to Ninian Park.

=== League Cup ===
| 21 August 2001 Round 1 | Millwall | 2–1 | Cardiff City | Millwall |
| | Richard Sadlier 24'; Steve Claridge 61' (pen.) | | 45' Robert Earnshaw | Stadium: The Den; Attendance: 5,516; Referee: Paul Danson (Leicester) |

=== LDV Vans Trophy ===
| 16 October 2001 Round 1 | Cardiff City | 7–1 | Rushden & Diamonds | Cardiff |
| | Mark Bonner 6'; Gavin Gordon 12'; Gavin Gordon 33'; Gavin Gordon 41'; Gavin Gordon 70'; Gavin Gordon 80'; Martyn Giles 79' | | 73' Paul Hall | Stadium: Ninian Park; Attendance: 2,052; Referee: Paul Armstrong (Berkshire) |

| 30 October 2001 Round 2 | Cardiff City | 1–3 | Peterborough United | Cardiff |
| | Kevin Nugent 90' (pen.) | | 8' (pen.) Jimmy Bullard; 78' Leon McKenzie; 83' Francis Green | Stadium: Ninian Park; Attendance: 2,584; Referee: John Brandwood (Lichfield) |

=== FAW Premier Cup ===
| 16 January 2002 Quarter Final | Newtown | 0–3 | Cardiff City | Newtown, Powys |
| 19:15 | | | Leon Jeanne; James Collins; Tony Wallis | Stadium: Latham Park; Attendance: 480 |

| 12 March 2002 Semi Final | Wrexham | 1–1 (a.e.t.) (3–4 p) | Cardiff City | Wrexham |
| 18:55 | Lee Trundle 85' | | 4' Gethin Jones | Stadium: The Racecourse; Attendance: 826; Referee: Brian Lawlor |

| 13 May 2002 Final | Cardiff City | 1–0 | Swansea City | Cardiff |
| 19:00 | Graham Kavanagh 54' | | | Stadium: Ninian Park; Attendance: 6,229; Referee: Ceri Richards (Llangennech) |

== Bibliography ==
- Hayes, Dean (2006). The Who's Who of Cardiff City. Breedon Books. ISBN 1-85983-462-0.
- Shepherd, Richard (2002). The Definitive Cardiff City F.C. Tony Brown. ISBN 1-899-46817-X.
- Rollin, Glenda; Rollin, Jack, eds. (2002). Rothmans Football Yearbook 2002-2003. Headline Book Publishing. ISBN 0-7553-1100-0.

== See also ==
- List of Cardiff City F.C. seasons
- 2001–02 in English football
