= Rhys Weston =

Welsh footballer (born 1980)

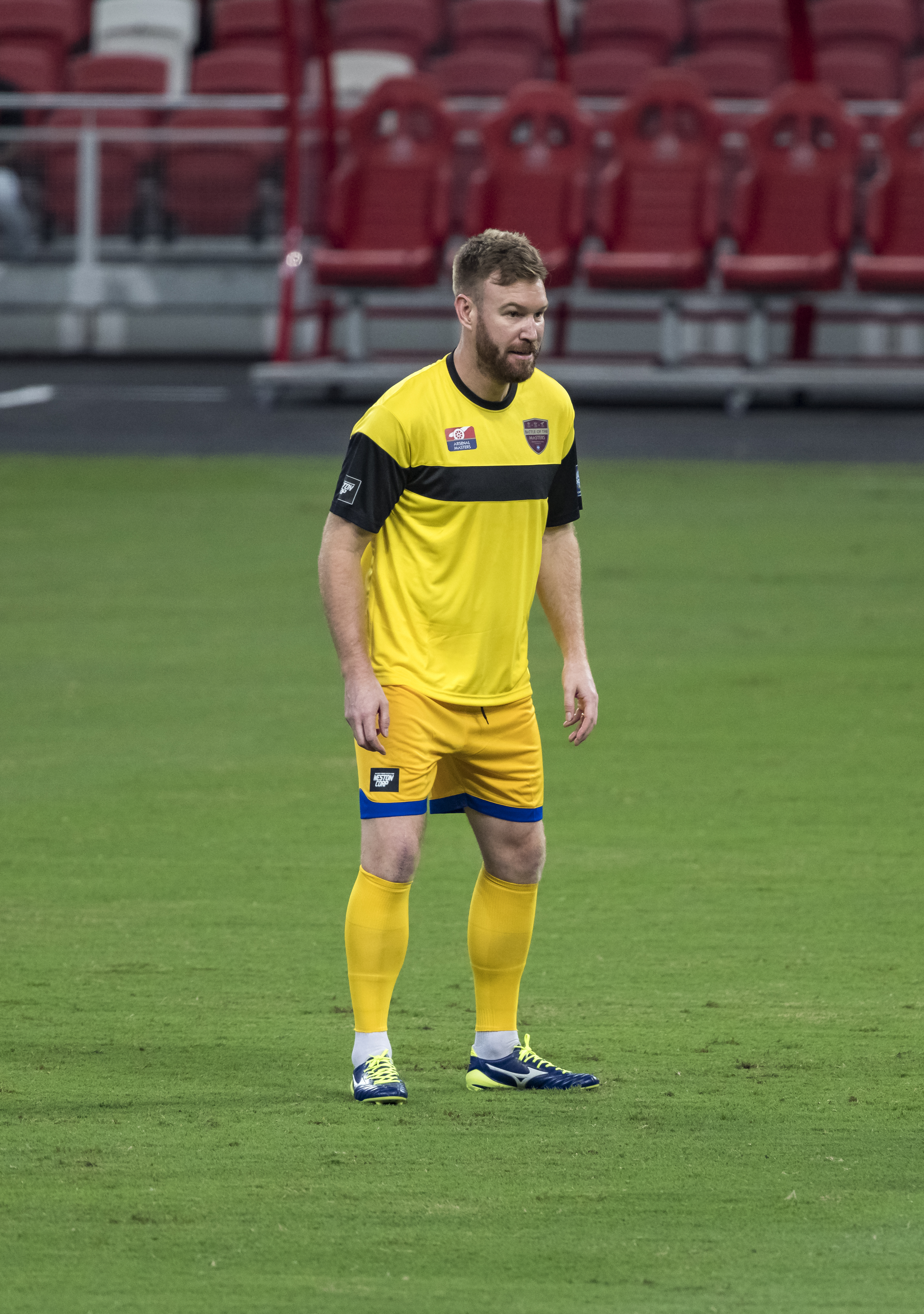
- Weston playing masters football in 2017

Personal information
- Full name: Rhys David Weston
- Date of birth: 27 October 1980 (age 46)
- Place of birth: Kingston upon Thames, London, England
- Height: 6 ft 0 in (1.83 m)
- Position: Defender

Youth career
- –1999: Arsenal Academy

Senior career*
Years	Team	Apps	(Gls)
1999–2000	Arsenal	1	(0)
2000–2006	Cardiff City	182	(2)
2006	Viking	1	(0)
2007	Port Vale	15	(0)
2007–2010	Walsall	102	(1)
2010–2012	Dundee	55	(1)
2012	KR Reykjavík	13	(0)
2012	Sabah FA	6	(0)
2013–2014	AFC Wimbledon	7	(0)
2014	→ Sutton United (loan)	6	(0)
2019	Cobham	3	(0)
Total		391	(4)

International career
2000–2001	Wales U21	4	(0)
2000–2005	Wales	7	(0)
- * Club domestic league appearances and goals

Rhys David Weston (born 27 October 1980) is a Welsh former professional footballer who played as a defender. He represented the Welsh national team seven times during his career.

An Arsenal Academy graduate, he made one league appearance in the 1999–2000 campaign before signing with Cardiff City. He spent six years with Cardiff, making 214 appearances in league and cup, helping them to two promotions as the club rose from the fourth to the second tier of English football. Released by the club in 2006, he travelled to Norway to sign with Viking FK, though he only played one game. In 2007, he returned to England with spells at Walsall and Port Vale. He moved to Scottish club Dundee in 2010 and captained the side to a second-place finish in the First Division in 2011–12. In May 2012, he joined Icelandic club KR Reykjavík. Five months later, he signed for Malaysian club Sabah FA. He returned to England with AFC Wimbledon in July 2013, and from there was loaned out to Sutton United in January 2014. He was released by Wimbledon on his return and subsequently retired from professional football.

Although born in England, he chose to represent Wales at international level, making his debut for the senior squad in a friendly against Portugal in June 2000.

== Early life ==
Weston was born in Kingston Hospital in Kingston upon Thames, London, to David and Wendy Weston and has two sisters, Katie and Carli. He moved away from home at the age of 14 to attend school in Lilleshall at the Football Association's centre of excellence. He was also a keen rugby player. However, he was forced to give up the game to focus on his football career.

== Club career ==
=== Arsenal ===
Weston played for Arsenal as a youth player, joining the club at the age of eleven after being spotted representing Surrey at county level, before he made his senior debut in the League Cup against Middlesbrough on 30 November 1999, Arsène Wenger bringing him on at half-time to replace Oleh Luzhnyi. Also making his debut for Arsenal that day was Ashley Cole. His first start came on 14 May 2000 at St James' Park, he was taken off for fellow youngster Brian McGovern after 67 minutes – Newcastle United finished 4–2 winners. It was the final league game of the season and neither side had anything to play for other than pride. Arsenal were resting their key players ahead of the UEFA Cup final against Galatasaray three days later. It was to be his only top flight appearance in English football. His first and only senior game at Highbury came on 1 November 2000, in a 2–1 defeat to Ipswich Town in the League Cup third round. He was taken off to give Lee Canoville his debut after 74 minutes.

=== Cardiff City ===
After being told by Arsenal manager Arsène Wenger that he was unlikely to make the grade at Premier League level, Weston signed for Cardiff City for a fee of £300,000 in November 2000. The Welsh club, who play in the English football league system, were then in the basement division and had promotion ambitions following financial investment from chairman Sam Hammam, who was looking to sign young Welsh players for the first-team. Weston made his Ninian Park debut on 22 November, Cardiff coming from behind to beat Lincoln City 3–2. Having converted from playing as a central defender to a full-back under Cardiff manager Alan Cork, describing it as being "hard to adapt" to the change, he played a further 31 games in his debut season as the club finished second behind Brighton & Hove Albion.

Having received criticism for his early performances at full-back for the club, Cork gave Weston a vote of confidence after being handed the number two shirt for the following season. Weston later commented, "I've heard a few comments, of course, but I was determined to work hard and learn about the position." However, a poor performance during a 3–0 defeat to Bury in November 2001 led to Weston being withdrawn from the starting line-up by Cork. The Bluebirds' hopes of back-to-back promotions were ended by Stoke City in the play-off semi-final in 2001–02. Weston played 43 games during the season, also picking up eight yellow cards along the way, and captained the side for the first time in his career during a Football League Trophy match against Brighton & Hove Albion. At the season's end he signed a long-term contract with the club. Cardiff managed to break out of the Second Division in 2002–03 via a 1–0 victory over Queens Park Rangers in the play-off final. Weston picked up ten yellow cards that season, but also scored his first senior goal on 26 October with a last-minute effort of a 4–0 home win over Tranmere Rovers. Weston and Cardiff adapted well to life in the First Division, though he played only 24 league games during the 2003–04 campaign. The defender remained upbeat over Cardiff's performances throughout the campaign. His season was hampered by a knee injury in October 2003, which required surgery. In March 2004, he then damaged the cartilage in his other knee. After returning from injury, he made just one further appearance before the end of the season.

In the 2004–05 season, the first season of the Championship, he played 25 games. In April 2005, he suffered an ankle injury that sidelined him for the rest of the season. At the end of the season Weston was one of five players who took "substantial reductions in their wages" (20%) in order to pave the way for the arrival of Darren Purse. This was the beginning of the end of his career with the "Bluebirds", as new manager Dave Jones did not "fancy" Weston as a player. Jones told him he was transfer-listed, though no offers were received for the full-back. In the 2005–06 season Weston appeared in 30 league games – this was in part due to some defensive departures from the previous season. In July 2006, he was left out of the club's pre-season tour of Canada. Cardiff were consistently in mid-table throughout the season, though Weston's time at Cardiff was limited and he played his final game for the club on 22 August 2006, in a 2–0 defeat by League Two Barnet in the League Cup, being replaced by youngster Darcy Blake at half time. Weston was released at the end of the month after his contract was cancelled by mutual consent and joined Norwegian side Viking in the Tippeligaen on a short-term deal.

=== Viking FK and Port Vale ===
His only match with the Stavanger-based club lasted just twelve minutes, as Weston dislocated his shoulder and was taken off during a league fixture against Brann. With the Viking manager sacked just four days after Weston's arrival, the incoming manager did not speak English, and so did not offer Weston a contract. Upon returning to the United Kingdom, Dave Jones refused to let him train with Cardiff, and so he instead began training with Yeovil Town.

Weston signed with League One side Port Vale in February 2007 after a period on trial, signing a contract that paid a fourth of the wages he was being paid at Cardiff. He played 15 games under Martin Foyle before being released at the end of the season. Foyle had told him he wanted a more attacking full-back, though would go on to tell a BBC interviewer that Weston's "attitude was wrong". Weston believed the real reason was down to money.

=== Walsall ===
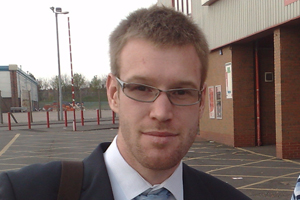
Weston in 2008

After spending time on trial with a club in Romania, Walsall signed Weston, also of League One, on 16 July 2007. He made his debut for the club on 18 August in a 1–0 defeat at Leyton Orient. He played fifty games in 2007–08 before penning a new two-year deal in March. On 20 September 2008, he was sent off for the first time in his career. The match was a bad-tempered affair at Brighton's Withdean Stadium; Weston was dismissed after 15 minutes and was followed by teammate Netan Sansara on 33 minutes, despite this a 44th minute Dwayne Mattis header earned the "Saddlers" a 1–0 win. Weston played 31 games that season and scored the third goal of his career on Boxing Day, a 64th-minute winner against Stockport County at the Bescot Stadium. He made thirty appearances in the 2009–10 season before manager Chris Hutchings decided against offering him a fresh contract at the end of the season.

=== Dundee ===
In July 2010, Weston signed a one-year contract with Dundee, following a trial with Motherwell. He had been searching for a transfer to a Scottish club for two years in order to be closer to his wife and son. After making his debut in a 2–0 victory over Montrose, he went on to make 32 appearances in his first season in Scotland in which Dundee would have finished just one point short of the First Division champions, Dunfermline Athletic, but instead finished in sixth place following a 25-point deduction for entering administration. Despite reported interest from Scottish Premier League sides, he signed a new one-year deal at the end of the season. He was appointed as captain for the start of the 2011–12 season by manager Barry Smith. He led the "Dark Blues" to a second-place finish, as Ross County ran away with the title, before leaving Dens Park in May.

=== KR Reykjavík and Sabah FA ===
Weston signed with Rúnar Kristinsson's Knattspyrnufélag Reykjavíkur on a two-year deal in May 2012. The Icelandic club were aiming to retain their Úrvalsdeild title in 2012. In August 2012, Weston announced that due to financial circumstances at the club, he was in discussion for terms to cancel his contract. In October 2012, he signed with Malaysian club Sabah FA on a one-year contract. The club had been relegated to the second tier or Malaysian football the previous season and Weston was one of several players brought in by new manager David McCreery. The side were forced to play matches on weekday afternoons due to floodlight problems and train at 9am each morning to avoid the extreme humidity later in the day. He was appointed captain of the side, making six league appearances.

=== AFC Wimbledon ===
In July 2013, Weston went on trial with League Two side AFC Wimbledon, and scored a goal in the "Dons" first friendly of the 2013–14 season, a 2–2 draw with Conference side Dartford at Princes Park on 6 July. He played the full ninety minutes in the "Dons" next friendly, a 2–0 win over Northern Premier League Premier Division side F.C. United of Manchester at The Cherry Red Records Stadium on 13 July. Weston came on as a second-half substitute in AFC Wimbledon's third pre–season game of the 2013–14 season, a 1–1 home draw against Championship side Charlton Athletic on 18 July. Three days later, Weston made his fourth friendly appearance for "The Dons" and played the full match as they beat Isthmian League Division One South side Walton Casuals 1–0 away at Waterside Stadium. Weston played in the "Dons" final pre–season game of the 2013–14 season, a 3–0 defeat to Italian Lega Pro Seconda Divisione/A side S.S.D. Monza 1912 at the Stadio Brianteo on 27 July 2013. Following Weston playing in all but one of the "Dons" pre–season games, manager Neal Ardley revealed he was hoping to sign Weston to a deal with AFC Wimbledon and on 7 August 2013, AFC Wimbledon confirmed the signing of Weston with Ardley praising Weston's desire to earn a contract with his dedication to the cause during pre–season.

On 6 January 2014, Weston joined Conference South side Sutton United on a one-month loan. He played six games at Gander Green Lane, playing in an unfamiliar role as a defensive midfielder. He did not feature for Wimbledon in the second half of the season and was not offered a new contract in the summer. Following his release, he retired from professional football to take up a role as a business development manager for a restaurant management company.

=== Cobham ===
In August 2019, Weston came out of retirement to join Combined Counties League Premier Division club Cobham. He made four early season appearances.

== International career ==
Born in England, Weston represented the country at schoolboy and under-16 levels. He also qualified to play for Wales due to his father hailing from Caerphilly in South Wales. In May 2000, he was called up to the Welsh senior squad for the first time prior to a match against Brazil, remaining on the bench as Wales suffered a 3–0 defeat. His first senior cap came ten days later against Portugal on 2 June 2000, with Wales recording another 3–0 loss. He was a late substitute for Gareth Roberts.

Weston then went into an under-21 side that fared poorly in the qualifying round of the 2002 UEFA European Under-21 Championship. The Welsh team drew one and lost nine, Weston played in four of these games. On 1 September, he played in a 4–1 defeat to Belarus. On 6 October he played in a 2–0 defeat to Norway, four days later he played in a 2–1 defeat to Poland. On 23 March 2001, he was part of a Wales side that lost 1–0 to Armenia. Following the defeat, he was one of four players, including Cardiff teammates Lee Kendall and Kevin Aherne-Evans, who returned to the squad hotel late after being allowed to go out for a drink. All four were sent home early from the squad.

Having been reprimanded by Wales manager Mark Hughes, Weston was excluded from Welsh senior and youth squads for one year, eventually returning to the senior squad in March 2002. His next call-up for the senior team was for a friendly with Croatia on 21 August 2002. He was a 60th-minute substitute for Darren Barnard, the game finished 1–1. He earned three caps in the UEFA Euro 2004 qualifying group stage. He played the last 20 minutes of a 2–0 win over Azerbaijan on 20 November 2002, coming on for Mark Delaney. His first senior start came on 12 February 2003, a 2–2 draw with Bosnia and Herzegovina, he played 60 minutes before being substituted for Matthew Jones. He also played on 10 September 2003 game with Finland; 72 minutes into the Finland game he was taken off for Andy Johnson and watched from the bench as the game finished 1–1, the draw was enough to book Wales a play–off match against Russia.

His last game for Wales was also John Toshack's first game as manager. Toshack brought Weston on for Rob Edwards after 49 minutes in a 2–0 win over Hungary on 9 February 2005. Toshack also called him into the squad for friendly with Cyprus in November 2005, though Weston did not make it onto the pitch. His final international call–up was on 1 March 2006 in a goalless draw with Paraguay, in which Weston remained on the bench.

== Other football roles ==
In September 2019, Weston joined the Venue Optimisation team at Brentford. He is also a co-commentator for Talksport.

== Career statistics ==
=== Club ===
Appearances and goals by club, season and competition
Club	Season	League			National cup (Note: Includes FA Cup, Scottish Cup, Norwegian Cup, Icelandic Football Cup, Malaysia FA Cup, Malaysia Cup)		League cup (Note: Includes Football League Cup, Scottish League Cup)		Other^{[A]}		Total	
Club	Season	Division	Apps	Goals	Apps	Goals	Apps	Goals	Apps	Goals	Apps	Goals
Arsenal	1999–2000	Premier League	1	0	0	0	1	0	0	0	2	0
Arsenal	2000–01	Premier League	0	0	0	0	1	0	0	0	1	0
Arsenal	Total		1	0	0	0	2	0	0	0	3	0
Cardiff City	2000–01	Third Division	28	0	3	0	1	0	1	0	33	0
Cardiff City	2001–02	Second Division	37	0	3	0	1	0	2	0	43	0
Cardiff City	2002–03	Second Division	38	2	5	0	2	0	4	0	49	2
Cardiff City	2003–04	First Division	24	0	1	0	1	0	―		26	0
Cardiff City	2004–05	Championship	25	0	2	0	2	0	―		29	0
Cardiff City	2005–06	Championship	30	0	1	0	3	0	―		34	0
Cardiff City	2006–07	Championship	0	0	0	0	1	0	―		1	0
Cardiff City	Total		182	2	15	0	11	0	7	0	215	2
Viking	2006	Tippeligaen	1	0	0	0	―		―		1	0
Port Vale	2006–07	League One	15	0	0	0	―		0	0	15	0
Walsall	2007–08	League One	44	0	5	0	0	0	1	0	50	0
Walsall	2008–09	League One	31	1	0	0	0	0	0	0	31	1
Walsall	2009–10	League One	27	0	2	0	1	0	0	0	30	0
Walsall	Total		102	1	7	0	1	0	1	0	111	1
Dundee	2010–11	Scottish First Division	30	0	1	0	1	0	0	0	32	0
Dundee	2011–12	Scottish First Division	25	1	0	0	2	0	1	0	28	1
Dundee	Total		55	1	1	0	3	0	1	0	60	1
KR Reykjavík	2012	Úrvalsdeild	13	0	3	0	―		0	0	16	0
Sabah FA	2012	Super League	6	0	0	0	―		0	0	6	0
AFC Wimbledon	2013–14	League Two	7	0	0	0	0	0	1	0	8	0
Sutton United (loan)	2013–14	Conference South	6	0	0	0	―		0	0	6	0
Cobham	2019–20	Combined Counties League; Premier Division	3	0	1	0	―		0	0	4	0
Career total			391	4	27	0	17	0	10	0	445	4

A. The "Other" column constitutes appearances (including substitutions) and goals in either the Football League Trophy, Football League play-offs, Scottish Challenge Cup or UEFA Champions League.

=== International ===
Wales national team
Year	Apps	Goals
2000	1	0
2002	2	0
2003	3	0
2005	1	0
Total	7	0

== Honours ==
Cardiff City

- Football League Third Division second-place promotion: 2000–01
- FAW Premier Cup: 2001–02
- Football League Second Division play-offs: 2003

Dundee

- Scottish League First Division second-place promotion: 2011–12
