= 2004–05 Notts County F.C. season =

Notts County
2004–05 season
- Manager: Gary Mills (until 4 November); Ian Richardson (from 4 November)
- Football League Two: 19th
- FA Cup: Third round
- Football League Cup: Second round
- Football League Trophy: First round

== Season summary ==
Gary Mills was sacked in November with Notts County in 21st position. Long-serving midfielder Ian Richardson was appointed caretaker manager for the remainder of the season and guided County to 18th place. He was replaced by former Iceland, Stoke City and Barnsley manager Guðjón Þórðarson.

== Players ==
=== First-team squad ===
Squad at end of season

Note: Flags indicate national team as defined under FIFA eligibility rules; some limited exceptions apply. Players may hold more than one non-FIFA nationality.

No.	Pos.	Nation	Player
1	GK	IRL	Saul Deeney (Note: Deeney was born in Derry, Northern Ireland, but also qualified to represent the Republic of Ireland internationally and represented the Republic of Ireland at U-21 level.)
2	DF	WAL	David Pipe
3	MF	ENG	Ian Richardson
4	DF	ENG	Mike Edwards
5	DF	ENG	Mike Whitlow
6	MF	ENG	Stefan Oakes
7	MF	ENG	Matthew Gill
8	DF	FRA	Julien Baudet
9	FW	ENG	Gavin Gordon
10	FW	RSA	Glynn Hurst (Note: Hurst was born in Barnsley, England, but was raised in South Africa and represented South Africa at U-23 level.)
11	MF	IRL	Tony Scully
12	MF	ENG	Chris Palmer
14	MF	ENG	Paul Bolland

No.	Pos.	Nation	Player
15	FW	WAL	Matthew Williams
16	FW	ENG	Steve Scoffham (Note: Scoffham was born in Münster, West Germany (now Germany), but was raised in England.)
17	DF	ENG	Robert Ullathorne
18	FW	ENG	Shaun Harrad
19	DF	NIR	Emmet Friars
20	DF	ENG	Kelvin Wilson
23	MF	IRL	Shane McFaul
24	MF	NIR	Eddie McIntyre
25	FW	ENG	Mark Stallard
27	DF	ENG	Tommy Hannigan
28	DF	ENG	Will Thacker
29	MF	AUS	Ruben Zadkovich
30	GK	ENG	Karl Dryden

=== Left club during season ===
Note: Flags indicate national team as defined under FIFA eligibility rules; some limited exceptions apply. Players may hold more than one non-FIFA nationality.

No.	Pos.	Nation	Player
21	DF	ENG	Craig Pead (on loan from Coventry City)
21	GK	IRL	Rob Elliot (Note: Elliot was born in Greenwich, England, but also qualified to represent the Republic of Ireland internationally through his father and represented the Republic of Ireland at under-19 level before making his international debut for the Republic of Ireland in May 2014.) (on loan from Charlton Athletic)
22	GK	IRL	Wayne Henderson (on loan from Aston Villa)
25	FW	BIH	Fahrudin Kuduzović (to Sligo Rovers)
26	GK	ENG	Steve Mildenhall (to Oldham Athletic)

No.	Pos.	Nation	Player
26	GK	AUS	Andy Petterson (to Farnborough Town)
27	FW	ENG	Marvin Robinson (to Rushden & Diamonds)
28	FW	FRA	Youssef Sofiane (on loan from West Ham United)
29	FW	ENG	Chris O'Grady (on loan from Leicester City)
30	MF	ENG	Spencer Commons (to Grantham Town)
