= Robert Earnshaw =

Wales international footballer (born 1981)

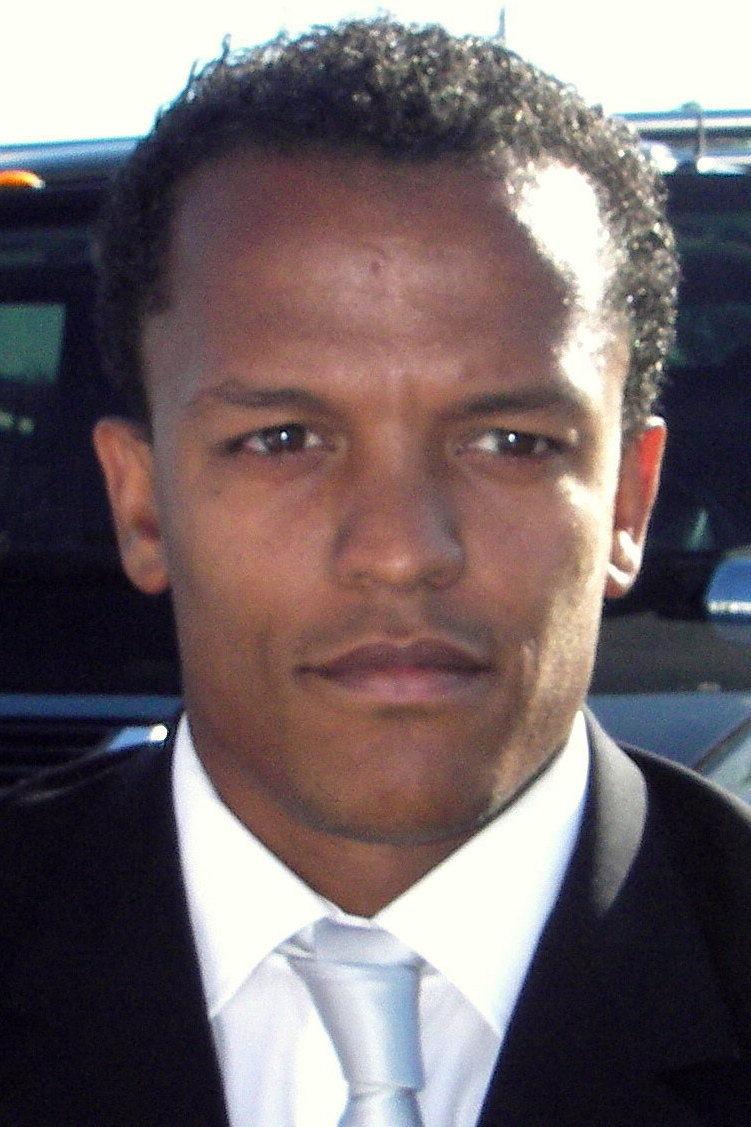
- Earnshaw in 2007

Personal information
- Full name: Robert Earnshaw
- Date of birth: 6 April 1981 (age 45)
- Place of birth: Mufulira, Zambia
- Height: 1.71 m (5 ft 7 in)
- Position: Striker

Youth career
- 1997–1998: Cardiff City

Senior career*
Years	Team	Apps	(Gls)
1998–2004	Cardiff City	183	(86)
2000	→ Greenock Morton (loan)	3	(2)
2004–2006	West Bromwich Albion	43	(12)
2006–2007	Norwich City	45	(27)
2007–2008	Derby County	22	(1)
2008–2011	Nottingham Forest	102	(38)
2011–2013	Cardiff City	19	(3)
2012–2013	→ Maccabi Tel Aviv (loan)	10	(2)
2013	Toronto FC	26	(8)
2014	Blackpool	1	(0)
2014	Chicago Fire	5	(3)
2015	Vancouver Whitecaps	9	(2)
2015	→ Whitecaps 2 (loan)	3	(2)
Total		471	(186)

International career
1998–2001	Wales U21	10	(1)
2002–2012	Wales	59	(16)
- * Club domestic league appearances and goals

Robert Earnshaw (born 6 April 1981) is a Welsh former international footballer who played as a forward. He is the only player to have scored a hat-trick in the Premier League, all three divisions of the English Football League, the League Cup, the FA Cup, and for his country in an international match.

Born in Zambia and raised in South Wales, Earnshaw joined Cardiff City as a Youth Training Scheme (YTS) trainee in 1997, and turned professional a year later. After making his debut at the age of sixteen, he spent a brief spell on loan with Greenock Morton before establishing himself in the first team. His prolific goalscoring saw him break several club records as he helped the club win promotion to the First Division in 2003. Scoring over 30 times in the First Division following promotion, he joined Premier League club West Bromwich Albion for £3.5 million in August 2004.

He played for several English clubs before later in his career playing in Israel, Canada, and the United States. After leaving Cardiff City in 2004, Earnshaw's transfer fees totalled £12,650,000. He made his international debut for Wales in 2002 and scored 16 goals in 59 games for the national side, making him its eighth-highest all-time goalscorer.

== Early life ==
One of five children, Earnshaw was born on the outskirts of the Zambian mining town of Mufulira on 6 April 1981 to Rita and English-born father David Earnshaw. His mother was a professional footballer in Zambia and later became a boxer and his father was a manager of a gold mine. His uncle Fidelis was also a professional footballer who played for Nkana and two of his cousins, Kalusha and Joel Bwalya, represented Zambia at international level. Kalusha later went on to become president of the Football Association of Zambia.

When Earnshaw was five, his family moved to Malawi where his father took charge of a coal mine and his youngest son began attending St. Andrews School in Lilongwe. The school was a six-hour drive from the family home and Earnshaw was forced to fly to the school each Monday with his brother David and three sisters, Sharon, Joanne and Diane, and live there through the week before flying home each Friday. He went on to attend Viphya School where he was taught the Chewa language, already being able to speak Bemba and English.

The family's stay was to be a short one again; in 1990, Earnshaw's father contracted typhoid fever and died in May of that year. Following the death of her husband, Rita decided to move the family to Bedwas, a small Welsh town near Caerphilly where her sister lived, in 1991. Earnshaw later commented: "It was the first time I had been away from Zambia. [...] It was much colder as well, just every little thing was different, everyone spoke English over here and although I could speak a little bit I had to learn. But when you're a kid you just get on with it." While living in Bedwas he became friends with David Pipe who lived nearby.

It was in Wales that he began playing football, kicking a ball around with friends between and after classes at Cardinal Newman RC School, Pontypridd, the school he moved on to after a spell at St. Helen's Primary. He grew up supporting Manchester United and also excelled at gymnastics and basketball. Cardinal Newman was a rugby union-playing school so Earnshaw's first organised football match came at the age of 11 with local youth side Llanbradach. After a year, he joined GE Wales where he gained reputation as a prolific goalscorer, netting 80 times in a single season.

== Club career ==
=== Cardiff City ===
Earnshaw's youth team, GE Wales, played their home matches in Treforest on a pitch nearby to the youth team base of Cardiff City. In 1997, Earnshaw scored a hat-trick during a youth match that was being watched by Gavin Tait, then a youth team coach for Cardiff, who invited Earnshaw and some of his teammates to training and, on 1 August, he signed a one-year YTS contract at Ninian Park. He had also previously been watched by scouts from Manchester United. He progressed through Cardiff's youth development programme, scoring over 47 goals for the club's youth side during a single season including a hat-trick in a Welsh Youth Cup final victory over Llanelli, before being handed his debut in an FAW Invitation Cup match against Wrexham on 27 October 1997 at the age of sixteen. He made his professional debut on 6 September 1997 as a substitute in place of Scott Partridge during a 2–0 defeat to Millwall in the Football League Trophy. He made his league debut four months later, again as a substitute in place of Wayne O'Sullivan during a 0–0 draw with Brighton & Hove Albion on 28 March 1998, and made four further league appearances during the 1997–98 season without scoring.

Four days prior to the start of the following season, Earnshaw signed his first full-time professional contract in August 1998 and was handed a start in the first game of the season in an away match against Hartlepool United. With Cardiff losing 1–0, Earnshaw scored a bicycle kick from ten yards out following a cross by John Williams to earn his side a point. However, after appearing in three further matches during the opening month of the season, he spent time away from Cardiff to attend trials with Middlesbrough under Bryan Robson and Fulham under Kevin Keegan. He returned to Cardiff but struggled to break into the side under manager Frank Burrows with Earnshaw later stating that he believed Burrows thought he would not "make the grade." After making a single appearance at the start of the 1999–2000 season, Earnshaw was loaned to Scottish side Greenock Morton in January 2000 by Burrows to gain experience and "toughen up", living above a local pub. Earnshaw later admitted that the experience at Morton helped him, commenting "It made me realise that I needed to work hard at my game so I could show Cardiff City that I could become a good player." During his loan spell, he played three games in the Scottish Football League First Division, scoring twice, and one Scottish Cup tie against Rangers. Originally signing on an initial three-month loan deal, he was recalled by Cardiff manager Billy Ayre after just one month when he replaced Burrows in charge and made five appearances in the final three months of the season, scoring once in a 2–1 defeat to Bournemouth.

The following season proved to be a breakout year for Earnshaw as he established himself in the first team, scoring 25 goals in all competitions including hat-tricks in a league match against Torquay United and a third round FA Cup tie against Bristol Rovers. His form saw him receive Cardiff's Young Player of the Year award and saw him named in the Football League Third Division PFA Team of the Year. In the 2002–03 season, Earnshaw scored on the opening day of the season in a 2–1 victory over Oldham Athletic but was used largely as a substitute in the opening month after manager Lennie Lawrence opted to play Andy Campbell after Earnshaw failed to score in pre-season. However, on 11 September 2002 he was handed a start against Boston United in the League Cup and scored a hat-trick. He went on to enjoy a prolific season, scoring two further hat-tricks in matches against Queens Park Rangers and Tranmere Rovers and also scored six braces, as Cardiff won promotion to the First Division after defeating Queens Park Rangers in the 2003 Football League Second Division play-off final at the Millennium Stadium. He finished the season with 35 goals in all competitions, despite scoring only once in his last eleven matches, breaking a club record for most goals scored in a single season which was previously held by Hughie Ferguson's tally of 32 during the 1926–27 season. His 31 goals in league matches also broke a 56-year-old club record previously held by Stan Richards. At the end of the season, Earnshaw was named Young Welsh Footballer of the Year, and was named in the PFA Division Two Team of the Year. Following the club's promotion, Earnshaw continued his form and scored over 30 goals during his first season in the First Division, including a four-goal haul during a 5–0 victory over Gillingham and a hat-trick against Leyton Orient in the League Cup.

His continued goalscoring form attracted attention from numerous clubs, including Scottish side Celtic and Premier League clubs Fulham, Charlton Athletic and Aston Villa. Cardiff chairman Sam Hammam had strongly resisted any potential approaches for Earnshaw and at one point claimed that "They would hang me in the city centre" if he was sold.

=== West Bromwich Albion ===
However, at the start of the following season, Earnshaw was transferred from Cardiff to West Bromwich Albion for £3 million, a fee that could have reached a maximum of £3.62 million with performance-related add-ons. His agent Mel Eves was fined 30,000 Swiss francs (£12,250) by FIFA in July 2007 over his role in the transfer. Eves was found guilty of acting for both his client (Earnshaw) and the buying club (Albion) in the deal.

Earnshaw made his Albion début in a 3–0 defeat at Liverpool on 11 September 2004, coming on as a second-half substitute. He scored his first goals for Albion in his seventh appearance, netting twice in a 2–2 draw at Southampton on 6 November 2004 and scores in the club's following two matches against Middlesbrough and Arsenal. His first and only Premier League hat-trick came against Charlton Athletic on 19 March 2005 after coming on as a substitute with 30 minutes remaining, scoring the first Premier League hat-trick scored by a West Bromwich Albion player. The hat-trick also meant the Earnshaw became the only player to have scored hat-tricks in all four professional divisions in England, the FA Cup, League Cup and in an international fixture. Although goals such as these helped the club retain their Premiership status, manager Bryan Robson preferred to use him from the bench as an impact player rather than as a starter. Nevertheless, Earnshaw finished as Albion's top goalscorer for that season with 14 goals, earning him the Ronnie Allen trophy.

He remained in the squad for 2005–06, although West Brom signed several additional forwards including Diomansy Kamara and Nathan Ellington as competition for places became more significant. In December 2005, Earnshaw submitted two transfer requests, but both were rejected. However, in January 2006 manager Bryan Robson said that Earnshaw would be allowed to leave, assuming there was a fair transfer fee on offer. Following his departure, Earnshaw criticised Robson over his treatment at the club and the lack of first team opportunities given to him. Robson rejected Earnshaw's claims and commented "the percentages when I used Earnshaw compared to the points we collected just don't stack up."

=== Norwich City ===
On transfer deadline day, 31 January 2006, Earnshaw signed a three-and-a-half-year contract for Norwich City for a fee of £2.75 million (rising to £3.5 million). Signed as a replacement for Dean Ashton, After making his debut in a 2–1 defeat to Ipswich Town on 5 February 2006, he opened his Norwich goal scoring account with a brace, late on in Norwich's 3–0 home win against Brighton on 14 February 2006. Earnshaw went on to score six further goals in the remaining matches of the 2005–06 season. The following season, he enjoyed a prolific start to the campaign, including braces against Barnsley, Southend United and Wolverhampton Wanderers, and, by January 2007, Earnshaw was the top-goalscorer in the division with 17 goals. He suffered a severe groin injury in training soon after, that was expected to rule him out of action for the rest of the season. However, he returned to first team action in April 2007 to score his 18th and 19th goals of the season against Leicester City and Sheffield Wednesday.

=== Derby County ===
His goalscoring exploits for Norwich led newly promoted Premier League side Derby County to break their transfer record, previously held by the £3 million transfer of Seth Johnson from Crewe Alexandra, by signing Earnshaw from Norwich City for a fee of £3.5 million on 29 June 2007. He made his debut for the Rams in a 2–2 draw against Portsmouth on 11 August 2007. Earnshaw struggled to make an impact at Derby and was in and out of the side at the start of the season before being dropped. His first goal for the club came in a 4–1 FA Cup defeat to Preston North End on 26 January 2008, by which time the man who signed him, Billy Davies, had left the club and been replaced by Paul Jewell. It wasn't until 28 April 2008 that he scored his first Premier League goal for the club, in the 6–2 home defeat to Arsenal. In a torrid season, Earnshaw made just seven starts in his debut season at Derby, with a further 17 appearances as sub. He was left out of the squad for the final game of the season against Reading when it was revealed that Jewell had accepted a bid from two unspecified clubs, later revealed to be Nottingham Forest and Sheffield United, bringing to an end what Earnshaw later stated was one of his worst seasons in football.

=== Nottingham Forest ===
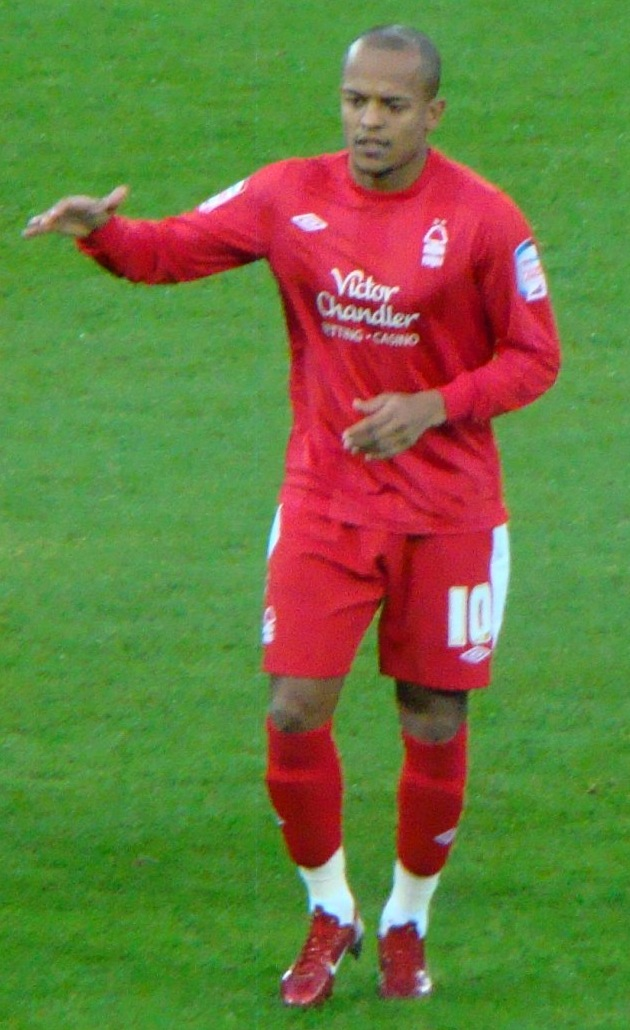
Earnshaw in Forest colours, 2010

In May 2008, less than a year after signing for Derby, Earnshaw joined Nottingham Forest for £2.65 million, signing a three-year deal. He made his competitive debut in a 0–0 draw with Reading on 10 August 2008, scoring his first competitive goals for Forest in their League Cup first-round tie at home to Morecambe, getting two on 13 August 2008. Earnshaw's first League goal for Forest came in their 3–2 victory over Watford in the Championship, at the City Ground on 23 August 2008. He scored his first hat trick for Nottingham Forest on 5 December 2009 in a 5–1 win over local rivals Leicester City.

The 2010–11 season saw Earnshaw struggle to find his feet early on despite some good performances, scoring only one in thirteen matches. His scoring picked up though, and he scored six goals in the last twelve games. This included two goals in the 5–2 win against Derby County at the City Ground, as well as the only goal in Forest's first ever victory at Pride Park against Derby. Earnshaw scored Forest's only goal in the 3–1 loss to Swansea City in the away leg of their play off semi final, also hitting the post in the dying minutes of the game, which would have levelled the scoreline at 2–2. In total he scored 43 goals in 111 appearances for Forest, making him one of their most successful strikers in recent years.

=== Return to Cardiff City ===
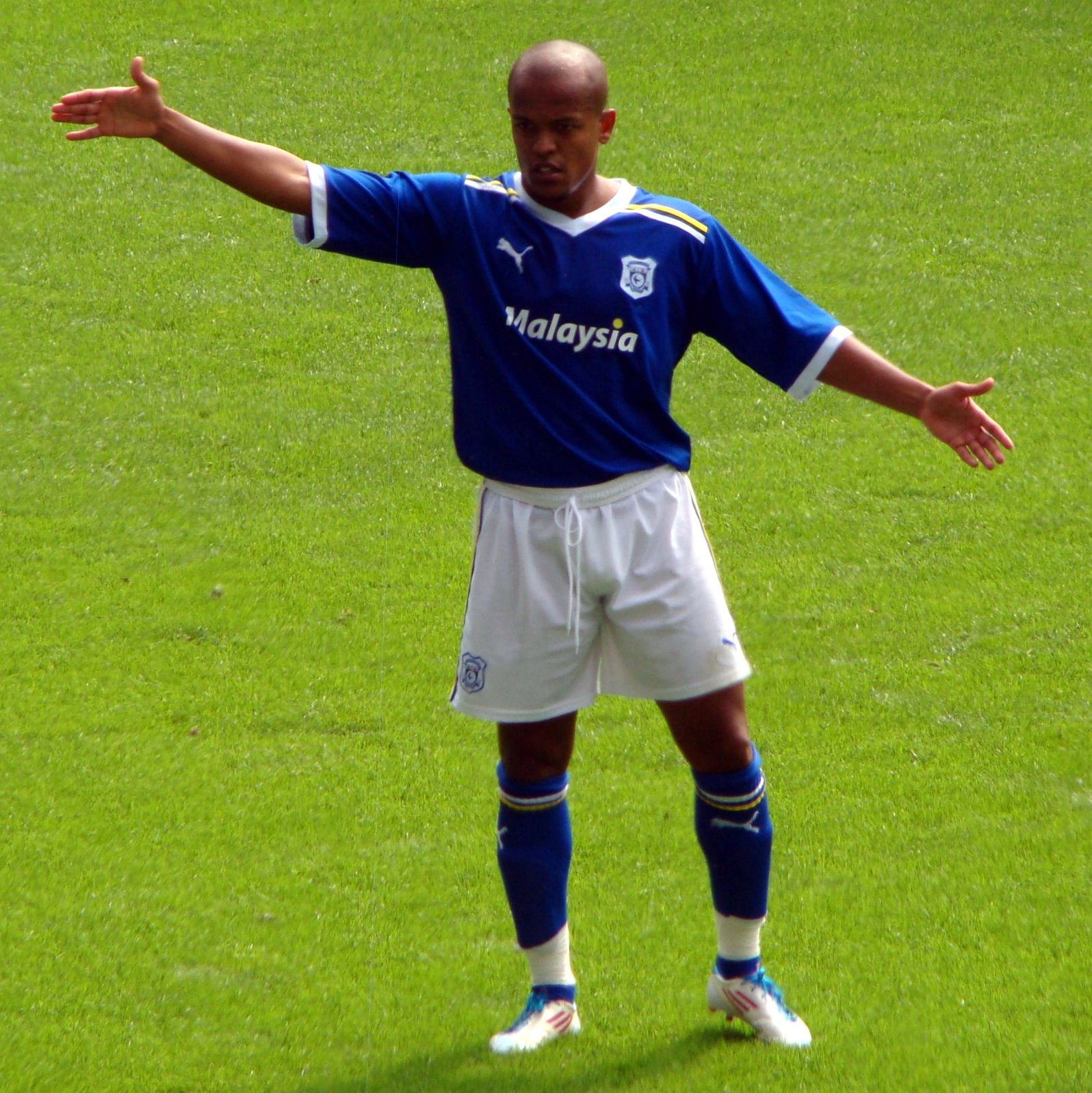
Earnshaw in action for Cardiff in 2011

On 6 July 2011, Earnshaw rejoined boyhood club Cardiff City on a free transfer, following unsuccessful talks with Nottingham Forest regarding contract renewal. Earnshaw would become new Cardiff City manager Malky Mackay's fourth free transfer signing since joining the Bluebirds from Watford.

Earnshaw made his second Cardiff debut in a 1–0 win over West Ham United on 7 August. Earnshaws' first goal since his return to the Bluebirds came the following Sunday in a 3–1 home victory over Bristol City in the Severnside derby. He scored his 200th career goal in a 1–1 draw with Burnley on 20 August, scoring the equaliser.

A change of the system at Cardiff and an off form Earnshaw saw him dropped to the bench to make way for Kenny Miller in a single man attack. Earnshaw made his first start since October in a 4–2 defeat to former club West Bromwich Albion on 7 January 2012, in which he scored. A league appearance didn't feature until two more months where he found himself coming off the bench against Hull City, in a 3–0 defeat. He would continue making substitute appearance for the BlueBirds, mostly featuring in the dying minutes of the game, up to the season's end. Cardiff City did make the play-offs, beaten 5–0 on aggregate by West Ham United, with Earnshaw making a brief appearance.

==== Maccabi Tel Aviv (loan) ====
On 20 September, after dropping down the pecking order at Cardiff, Earnshaw moved to Israel with Maccabi Tel Aviv on a season-long loan, and was given the number 19 shirt. After joining Maccabi Tel Aviv, Earnshaw believed joining the club would make him a better player once he returned to Cardiff City and said he had a chance to work with the club's Sports Director Jordi Cruyff.

He made his club debut, coming on as substitute in a second half, in a 4–0 win over Hapoel Ironi Kiryat Shmona on 24 September 2012, and after two appearances, he scored his first goal in a 2–1 win over Ashdod 2 weeks later. His second goal came three months later when he scored a winner in a 2–1 win over Maccabi Netanya. Earnshaw spent part of the 2012 Israel-Gaza conflict in Tel Aviv, during which he expressed his shock at the city coming under rocket fire, saying: "I looked over at these guys who had many years' service in the army. They knew exactly what was going on. One of them shouted that we had to take cover up by the side of the dressing rooms, so we just ran after them. Then we heard a loud bang of the Iron Dome – a new protection system used to intercept rockets. We then had to protect ourselves from all the shrapnel coming down".

On returning to Cardiff, manager Malky Mackay deemed Earnshaw surplus to requirements in January 2013, announcing that he would leave the club.

=== Toronto FC ===
On 28 February 2013, Earnshaw confirmed he had left Cardiff City to join Canadian Major League Soccer club Toronto FC. He made his debut two days later in a 1–0 away defeat to fellow Canadians Vancouver Whitecaps. The following week, on 9 March, Earnshaw scored two goals and first for the club in a 2–1 home victory over Sporting Kansas City, helping to earn new manager Ryan Nelsen his first coaching victory. Earnshaw was awarded MLS player of the week for his two-goal performance, becoming the first Toronto player to be given the honour since Danny Koevermans the previous summer.

=== Blackpool ===
On 21 March 2014, Earnshaw joined Championship side Blackpool on a short-term deal until the end of the 2013–14 season. He made a single appearance for the club, coming on as a substitute in place of Elliot Grandin during a 1–0 defeat to Bolton Wanderers on 25 March 2014, before being released at the end of his contract.

=== Chicago Fire ===
On 15 August 2014, Earnshaw returned to MLS, joining Chicago Fire on a free transfer. Eight days later he scored his first goal for the Fire, heading in a Grant Ward cross in a 2–2 draw against his former club Toronto; a week later he made it two goals in two games when he headed in the only goal against Dallas at Chicago's Toyota Park.

=== Vancouver Whitecaps ===
In February 2015, Earnshaw went on trial with Vancouver Whitecaps, playing in their 3–2 win over Stabæk. On 25 March, the Whitecaps announced his signing. Earnshaw made an immediate impact as a late substitute in his Whitecaps debut against the Portland Timbers three days later by scoring the winning goal in the 90th minute on his first touch of the ball.

His second goal was scored as a stoppage time substitute, scoring off of his second touch of the ball in a 3–0 defeat of the Houston Dynamo.

=== Football playing retirement ===
Earnshaw announced his retirement on 28 January 2016. He was named head coach of the Vancouver U-14 Pre-Residency team.

== International career ==
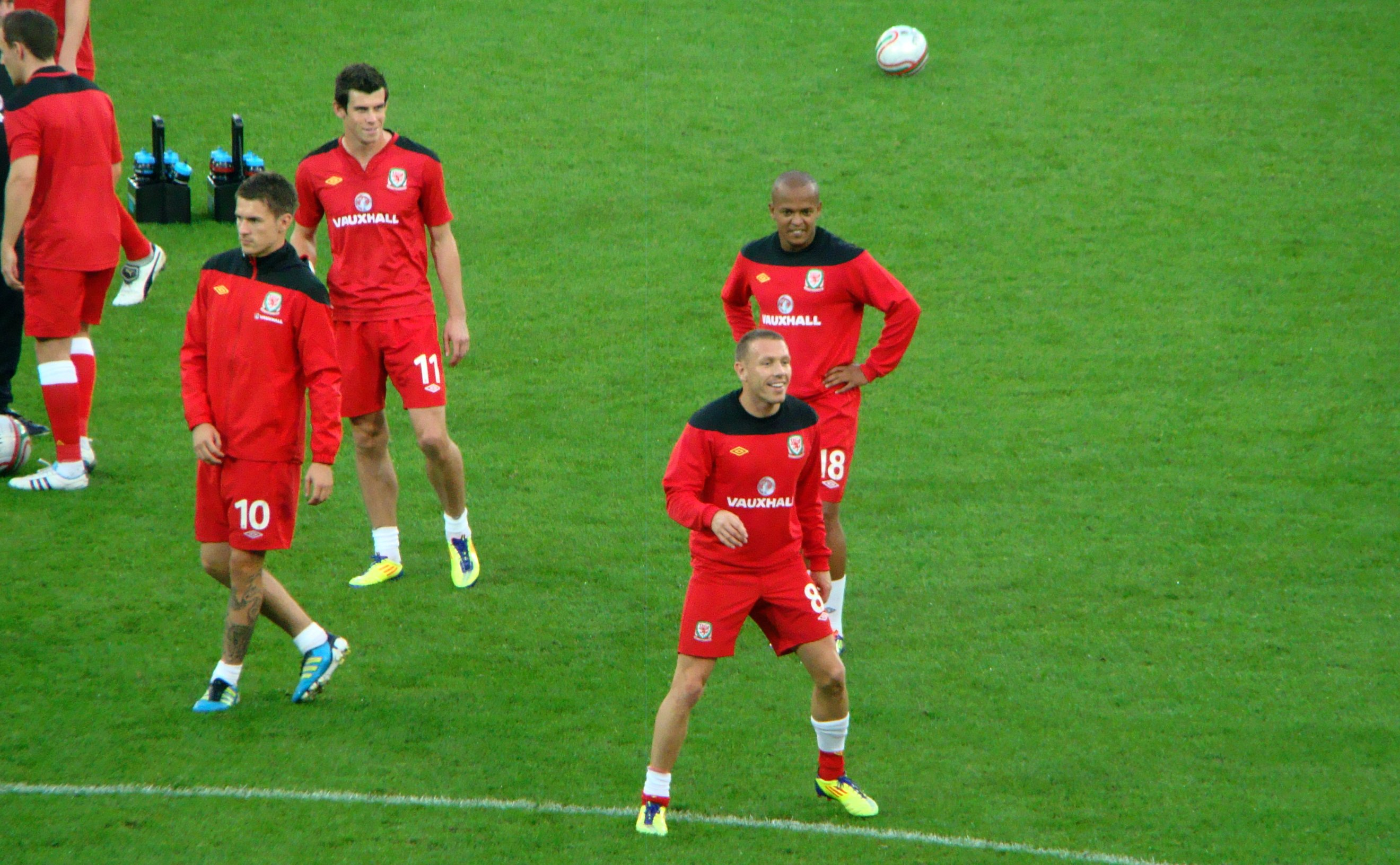
Earnshaw (No.18) warming up for Wales, 2011

Born in Zambia, Earnshaw chose to represent Wales at international level, stating "I thought long and hard about what to do, but Wales was my country. It was where I grew up." Bobby Gould, who managed Wales until 1999, stated that he convinced Earnshaw to switch allegiance, helping him overcome concerns over potential playing time. He was capped by Wales at youth level won ten caps for the under-21 side, scoring once in a 4–1 defeat to Belarus. His exploits in Cardiff City's promotion campaigns attracted the attention of national coach Mark Hughes. Earnshaw made his debut in May 2002, scoring the winning goal on his debut for Wales against Germany at the Millennium Stadium; he was also named man of the match. Earnshaw became a key member of the Wales squad during the Euro 2004 qualifying campaign. He staked his claim for a regular slot in the starting line-up with a hat-trick in the 4–0 friendly win over Scotland in February 2004. At the end of 2003–04, Earnshaw was named in the First Division team of the year.

Because of racism directed to Earnshaw and others, from a Euro 2004 qualifying match, Serbia were handed a fine as a result of the abuse towards the Welsh football players.

He represented Wales on 59 occasions over a decade and on 25 May 2011 captained the side against the Scotland at the Nations Cup. On 6 September 2011, in a Euro 2012 qualifier against England, he came on as a substitute with his team 1–0 down, and missed an 'open goal' from six yards, as England held on to win. Unused since August 2012, in the following March, Earnshaw stated that he was still available for selection by the national side, a message that he reiterated that October.

== Coaching career ==
After working as a youth coach with the Vancouver Whitecaps, on 30 January 2018, Earnshaw was announced as an assistant coach for United Soccer League side Fresno ahead of their inaugural season. On 20 December 2021, Robert Earnshaw joins USL Championship side Orange County as assistant coach.

From May 2020, the former football player studied in Wales for the UEFA Pro License, to become a coach in Europe.

== Personal life ==
Earnshaw was raised in Lansbury Park in Caerphilly, Wales, where he moved to from Zambia as a teenager.

Earnshaw's son, known as Silva Mexes, signed for the Manchester United under 14 football team at the end of the 2023/24 season as well as the Thailand national U-17 team through his half-Thai mother.

In June 2024, Earnshaw married Bollywood actress Zarah Shah in Luttrellstown Castle.

== Career statistics ==
=== Club ===
As of 8 November 2015

Appearances and goals by club, season and competition
Club	Season	League			National cup (Note: Includes FA Cup, Scottish Cup)		League cup (Note: Includes Football League Cup, Toto Cup)		Other		Total	
Club	Season	Division	Apps	Goals	Apps	Goals	Apps	Goals	Apps	Goals	Apps	Goals
Cardiff City	1997–98	Third Division	5	0	–		–		–		5	0
Cardiff City	1998–99	Third Division	5	1	1	0	–		–		6	1
Cardiff City	1999–2000	Second Division	6	1	–		–		–		6	1
Cardiff City	2000–01	Third Division	36	19	4	6	1	0	–		41	25
Cardiff City	2001–02	Second Division	32	12	3	2	1	1	–		36	15
Cardiff City	2002–03	Second Division	46	31	4	1	2	3	–		55	35
Cardiff City	2003–04	First Division	46	21	1	0	2	5	–		49	26
Cardiff City	2004–05	Championship	4	1	–		1	1	–		5	2
Cardiff City	Total		183	86	13	9	7	10	–		203	105
Greenock Morton (loan)	1999–2000	Scottish First Division	3	2	1	0	–		–		4	2
West Bromwich Albion	2004–05	Premier League	31	11	3	3	–		–		34	14
West Bromwich Albion	2005–06	Premier League	12	1	1	0	3	2	–		16	3
West Bromwich Albion	Total		43	12	4	3	3	2	–		50	17
Norwich City	2005–06	Championship	15	8	–		–		–		15	8
Norwich City	2006–07	Championship	30	19	1	0	1	0	–		32	19
Norwich City	Total		45	27	1	0	1	0	–		47	27
Derby County	2007–08	Premier League	22	1	2	1	1	0	–		25	2
Nottingham Forest	2008–09	Championship	32	12	2	2	2	3	–		36	17
Nottingham Forest	2009–10	Championship	34	17	1	0	2	0	–		37	17
Nottingham Forest	2010–11	Championship	36	9	2	0	0	0	–		38	9
Nottingham Forest	Total		102	38	5	2	4	3	–		111	43
Cardiff City	2011–12	Championship	19	3	1	1	1	0	1	0	22	4
Maccabi Tel Aviv (loan)	2012–13	Israeli Premier League	10	2	0	0	1	1	–		11	3
Toronto	2013	MLS	26	8	0	0	0	0	–		26	8
Blackpool	2013–14	Championship	1	0	0	0	0	0	–		1	0
Chicago Fire	2014	MLS	5	3	0	0	0	0	–		5	3
Vancouver Whitecaps	2015	MLS	9	2	0	0	1 (Note: Appearance in MLS Cup play-offs)	0	4 (Note: Appearances in CONCACAF Champions League)	0	14	2
Career total			468	184	27	16	19	16	5	0	519	216

=== International ===
Scores and results list Wales' goal tally first, score column indicates score after each Earnshaw goal.

List of international goals scored by Robert Earnshaw
No.	Date	Venue	Opponent	Score	Result	Competition
1	14 May 2002	Millennium Stadium, Cardiff, Wales	Germany	1–0	1–0	Friendly
2	12 February 2003	Millennium Stadium, Cardiff, Wales	Bosnia and Herzegovina	1–1	2–2	Friendly
3	11 October 2003	Millennium Stadium, Cardiff, Wales	Serbia and Montenegro	2–3	2–3	UEFA Euro 2004 qualification
4	18 February 2004	Millennium Stadium, Cardiff, Wales	Scotland	1–0	4–0	Friendly
5	18 February 2004	Millennium Stadium, Cardiff, Wales	Scotland	2–0	4–0	Friendly
6	18 February 2004	Millennium Stadium, Cardiff, Wales	Scotland	3–0	4–0	Friendly
7	31 March 2004	Ferenc Puskás Stadium, Budapest, Hungary	Hungary	2–1	2–1	Friendly
8	8 September 2004	Millennium Stadium, Cardiff, Wales	Northern Ireland	2–2	2–2	2006 FIFA World Cup qualification
9	13 October 2004	Millennium Stadium, Cardiff, Wales	Poland	1–0	2–3	2006 FIFA World Cup qualification
10	27 May 2006	UPC-Arena, Graz, Austria	Trinidad and Tobago	1–1	2–1	Friendly
11	27 May 2006	UPC-Arena, Graz, Austria	Trinidad and Tobago	2–1	2–1	Friendly
12	11 October 2006	Millennium Stadium, Cardiff, Wales	Cyprus	2–0	3–1	UEFA Euro 2008 qualification
13	17 October 2007	San Marino Stadium, Serravalle, San Marino	San Marino	1–0	2–1	UEFA Euro 2008 qualification
14	29 May 2009	Parc y Scarlets, Llanelli, Wales	Estonia	1–0	1–0	Friendly
15	25 May 2011	Aviva Stadium, Dublin, Republic of Ireland	Scotland	1–0	1–3	2011 Nations Cup
16	27 May 2011	Aviva Stadium, Dublin, Republic of Ireland	Northern Ireland	2–0	2–0	2011 Nations Cup

== Hat-trick record ==
He is the only player to have scored hat-tricks in the Premier League, Divisions 1, 2 and 3, the FA Cup, the League Cup, and in an international match.

- Premiership, West Bromwich Albion vs. Charlton, 19 March 2005
- Championship (Division 1), Cardiff vs. Gillingham (13 September 2003) and Nottingham Forest vs. Leicester City (5 December 2009)
- League One (Division 2), Cardiff vs. QPR (29 November 2002) and vs. Tranmere Rovers (14 March 2003)
- League Two (Division 3), Cardiff vs. Torquay United (2 December 2000)
- FA Cup, Cardiff vs. Bristol Rovers (19 November 2000)
- League Cup, Cardiff vs. Boston United (11 September 2002) and vs. Leyton Orient (12 August 2003)
- International, Wales vs. Scotland (18 February 2004)

== Honours ==
Cardiff City

- Football League Second Division play-offs: 2003
- Football League Third Division promotion: 1998–99, 2000–01
- FAW Premier Cup: 2002
- Football League Cup runner-up: 2011–12

Maccabi Tel Aviv

- Israeli Premier League: 2012–13

Individual

- Cardiff City Young Player of the Year: 1998–99, 1999–2000, 2000–01
- PFA Fans' Player of the Year: 2002–03 Second Division
- PFA Team of the Year: 2000–01 Third Division, 2002–03 Second Division, 2003–04 First Division
- Cardiff City Player of the Year: 2002–03
- Football League Second Division Top Scorer: 2002–03
- Welsh Footballer of the Year: 2004
