= Gavin Gordon (footballer) =

English footballer and coach

Personal information
- Full name: Gavin Kenyatta Gordon
- Date of birth: 24 June 1979 (age 47)
- Place of birth: Manchester, England
- Height: 6 ft 1 in (1.85 m)
- Position: Striker

Youth career
- Hull City

Senior career*
Years	Team	Apps	(Gls)
1995–1997	Hull City	38	(9)
1997–2000	Lincoln City	99	(29)
2000–2004	Cardiff City	50	(6)
2002	→ Oxford United (loan)	6	(1)
2004–2006	Notts County	33	(5)
2006	Crawley Town	4	(0)
2007–2008	Histon	0	(0)
2012–2013	Sleaford Town	7	(3)
2013–2014	Three Bridges	2	(0)
- * Club domestic league appearances and goals

Gavin Kenyatta Gordon (born 24 June 1979) is an English former professional footballer who played as a striker.

Gordon played in the Football League between 1995 and 2006, playing for Hull City, Lincoln City, Cardiff City, Oxford United and Notts County. In 2006, he moved into Non-league football and appeared for Crawley Town and Histon before retiring in 2008. In 2012, he joined the coaching staff of Sleaford Town and also shortly afterwards he came out of retirement as well as continuing his role as a coach.

In November 2013, Gordon signed for Three Bridges.

== Career ==
A youth player at Hull City, Gordon became the second youngest player to ever play for them when he came on as a substitute against Coventry City in the Football League Cup. But he struggled to ever establish himself at Hull and was allowed to leave and join Lincoln City for £30,000 in November 1997 where he formed a very effective strike partnership with Lee Thorpe. His scoring feats at Lincoln lead Cardiff City to pay £550,000 for him in December 2000, with the amount due to rise depending on appearances but he never reached the required amount. He scored his first goal for Cardiff on 1 January 2001 with a header during a 6–1 victory over Exeter City, but the rest of his season was spent on the treatment table with persistent back problems. The same injury ruled him out of a large part of the following year, although one of the matches he did manage to play in was a Football League Trophy match against Rushden & Diamonds which ended in a 7–1 victory for Cardiff with Gordon finding the net five times.

He spent a short time on loan at Oxford United to gain fitness. At Oxford he scored the winning goal on his debut against York City before returning to Ninian Park where he finally broke into the first team but at the end of the year he was released. He was signed by Notts County where he managed to regain some of the form he showed at Lincoln. After a stuttering second year he left to join Crawley Town on a free transfer but suffered a serious injury during the season which has seen him out of action for over a year. He signed for Histon at the start of the 2007–08 season but did not make an appearance for them due to the injury. He then went on to play for Heckington, amateur side.

In October 2012, he was appointed to act as coach to Kris Jones who had taken over the running of Sleaford Town's reserve team in the Lincolnshire Football League. He also made occasional appearances for the team, debuting in the 2–0 home defeat to Grimsby Borough Reserves on 13 October 2012 and making 3+4 league appearances in which he netted three times including a brace against Louth Town Reserves. In June 2013, with Kris Jones having been promoted to first team manager, Gordon stepped up to become first team coach at Sleaford Town with his one-time Lincoln City teammate Terry Fleming acting as assistant manager.

== Personal life ==
Gordon now works as a postman for Royal Mail and lives in Sleaford.

== Career statistics ==
Appearances and goals by club, season and competition
Club	Season	League			FA Cup		League Cup		Other		Total	
Club	Season	Division	Apps	Goals	Apps	Goals	Apps	Goals	Apps	Goals	Apps	Goals
Hull City	1995–96	Second Division	13	3	0	0	2	0	0	0	15	3
Hull City	1996–97	Third Division	20	4	0	0	2	1	1	0	23	5
Hull City	1997–98	Third Division	5	2	0	0	1	0	0	0	6	2
Hull City	Total		38	9	0	0	5	1	1	0	44	10
Lincoln City	1997–98	Third Division	13	3	4	0	0	0	1	0	18	3
Lincoln City	1998–99	Second Division	27	5	0	0	0	0	2	0	29	5
Lincoln City	1999–2000	Third Division	41	11	3	1	2	1	1	0	47	13
Lincoln City	2000–01	Third Division	18	10	2	1	0	0	0	0	20	11
Lincoln City	Total		99	29	9	2	2	1	4	0	114	32
Cardiff City	2000–01	Third Division	10	1	0	0	0	0	0	0	10	1
Cardiff City	2001–02	Second Division	15	2	2	1	1	0	1	5	19	8
Cardiff City	2002–03	Second Division	10	2	0	0	0	0	1	1	11	3
Cardiff City	2003–04	First Division	15	1	0	0	1	0	0	0	16	1
Cardiff City	Total		50	6	2	1	2	0	2	6	56	13
Oxford United (loan)	2002–03	Third Division	6	1	0	0	1	0	0	0	7	1
Notts County	2004–05	League Two	27	5	4	3	0	0	1	0	32	8
Notts County	2005–06	League Two	6	0	1	0	0	0	0	0	7	0
Notts County	Total		33	5	5	3	0	0	1	0	39	8
Crawley Town	2005–06	Conference National	4	0	0	0	0	0	0	0	4	0
Histon	2007–08	Conference Premier	0	0	0	0	0	0	0	0	0	0
Career total			230	50	16	6	10	3	8	6	264	65
