= Kevin Aherne-Evans =

Welsh footballer and manager

Personal information
- Date of birth: 16 December 1980 (age 45)
- Place of birth: Carmarthen, Wales
- Positions: Defender; midfielder

Team information
- Current team: Brisbane Strikers (Head coach)

Senior career*
Years	Team	Apps	(Gls)
1998–2000	Leeds United	0	(0)
2000	→ Swansea City (loan)	2	(0)
2000–2002	Cardiff City	30	(3)
2002	→ Boston United (loan)	1	(0)
2002–2004	Merthyr Tydfil	?	(?)
2004	Newport County	14	(0)
2004–2007	Carmarthen Town	54	(12)
2007–2008	Rochedale Rovers		
2010–2012	Noosa Lions		
2012–2013	Sunshine Coast		

International career
1999–2000	Wales U21	4	(0)

Managerial career
- 2011–2012: Noosa Lions
- 2012–2014: Sunshine Coast
- 2014–2016: Brisbane Strikers
- 2016–2020: Noosa Lions
- 2020–2021: Brisbane Roar (assistant)
- 2025–present: Brisbane Strikers
- 2026–present: Solomon Islands (assistant)
- * Club domestic league appearances and goals

Kevin Aherne-Evans (born 16 December 1980) is a Welsh football coach and former professional footballer. During his playing career, he made 32 appearances in the Football League for Cardiff City and Swansea City before playing in the Welsh Premier League and Australia. He also won four caps for the Wales Under-21 team. He is currently manager of Brisbane Strikers FC. Prior to 2003 he was known as Kevin Evans.

== Playing career ==
Born in Carmarthen, Evans began his career at Leeds United as a central defender in a talented youth side which included Stephen McPhail, Jonathan Woodgate and Harry Kewell. However, he was unable to break into the first team at the club and instead joined Swansea City on loan in 2000, making two appearances in matches against Lincoln City and Cheltenham Town. He returned to Leeds after the end of his loan spell but was released at the end of the 1999–2000 season. Having spent time training with the club, he later signed for Cardiff City, as part of the club's plans to build a spine of young Welsh players in the squad.

On his arrival at Ninian Park, Cardiff manager Bobby Gould switched Evans to a midfield role where he made all of his appearances for the side. Making his debut on 2 September 2000 in a 1–1 draw with Rochdale, he went on to make a total of 35 appearances in all competitions during his first season, scoring five times, as Cardiff finished second in Division Three and were promoted to Division Two. However following promotion, Evans was unable to win a place in the side and also admitted that he lacked commitment and discipline, commenting, "There is a void in my football career where I don't really know what went wrong, when I let so much slip away from me, people questioned how much I wanted it". He was also one of four players disciplined by the FAW after missing a late night team curfew prior to a Wales under-21 match against Azerbaijan under-21s in 2001, alongside Cardiff teammates Lee Kendall and Rhys Weston.

Having not made an appearance during the first half of the season, he joined Boston United on loan. After returning from his loan spell, he remained with the side until September 2002 when his contract with the club was cancelled by mutual consent. Aherne-Evans rejected a contract offer from Cheltenham Town, before eventually joining non-league side Merthyr Tydfil where he spent two years before signing for Newport County in June 2004 after a successful trial. He made fourteen appearances before being released after five months and then joined his hometown club Carmarthen Town. The club were struggling within the Welsh Premier League on his arrival, avoiding relegation in his first season due to turmoil at Barry Town, but was part of a side that managed to qualify for European competition in consecutive seasons in the following years, including achieving a fourth-placed finish in his final year at the club.

Disillusioned with football in the UK, Aherne-Evans decided to emigrate to Australia at the age of 25. Although he initially had no plans to continue playing football, he later had an unsuccessful trial with A-League side Brisbane Roar before joining Rochedale Rovers.

== Managerial career ==
After spending time as a commentator for BBC Wales, in February 2011, Aherne-Evans was appointed manager of Noosa Lions at the age of just 31. He had originally joined the club as a player-coach with the plan of coaching the club's reserve side but was handed the job following the departure of manager Richard Hudson. He went on to achieve his UEFA B coaching licence, taking the course alongside Patrick Vieira and David Ginola during a week-long session in Cardiff.

The following year, he again replaced Hudson, this time at National Premier League Queensland side Sunshine Coast. He resigned from his role in September 2014 after finishing eighth in the league. He remained in the NPL, taking charge of Brisbane Strikers the following season. He led the club to a regular season championship in 2016, being defeated in the play-off semi-finals. In September 2016, Aherne-Evans announced his resignation from the role in order to spend more time with his family, stating that his time with Brisbane had been one of the "most satisfying experiences" of his career.

On 13 October 2016, Aherne-Evans rejoined Noosa Lions as head coach, technical director and academy director. Club chairwoman Alinda Bryant commented on his return, "Kevin was hugely sought after all over Australia and we are very fortunate he chose to be an integral part of our coaching staff at Noosa".

Aerne-Evans led Noosa to 3 successive premierships (2017, 2018 and 2019), their first since 2000 and their first grand final victory (2018) since 2001.

In October, 2020, Aherne-Evans was appointed senior assistant coach at A-League side Brisbane Roar.

== Personal life ==
Following their marriage, he adopted his wife Katie's surname, becoming Aherne-Evans.

== Honours ==
Brisbane Strikers

- National Premier Leagues Queensland : 2016
