= Charlie Mapes =

English footballer (born 1982)

Personal information
- Full name: Charles Edward Mapes
- Date of birth: 4 July 1982 (age 44)
- Place of birth: West Hampstead, England
- Position: Midfielder

Youth career
- Tottenham Hotspur
- 2000–2001: Cardiff City

Senior career*
Years	Team	Apps	(Gls)
2001	Harrow Borough		
2001	Greenock Morton	2	(0)
2001–2002	Edgware Town		
2002–2003	Wealdstone		
2003	Berkhamsted Town		
2003–2004	Wycombe Wanderers	15	(3)
2004–2005	Crawley Town	27	(1)
2005	→ Canvey Island (loan)	2	(0)
2005–2006	Yeading		
2006	→ Hendon (loan)	13	(1)
2006–2007	Hemel Hempstead Town		
2007–2008	Barton Rovers		
2007–2008	→ Hayes & Yeading United (dual registration)		
2008–2009	Hendon	16	(2)
- * Club domestic league appearances and goals

Charles Edward Mapes (born 4 July 1982) is an English former professional footballer best known for playing in The Football League for Wycombe Wanderers, and in the Scottish Football League for Greenock Morton.

== Club career ==
=== Early career ===
Born in West Hampstead, Mapes played for both Tottenham Hotspur and Cardiff City at youth level, before beginning his senior career at Harrow Borough in 2001. Following this, he had a trial spell at Greenock Morton in 2002, during which he made 2 appearances, before spells at non-league sides Edgware Town, Wealdstone and Berkhamsted Town.

=== Wycombe Wanderers ===
In summer 2003, Mapes joined Second Division side Wycombe Wanderers where he signed a professional contract. He scored for Wycombe on his debut against Stockport County on the opening game of the 2003–04 season. He made 18 appearances in all competitions for Wycombe Wanderers and scored three goals.

=== Crawley Town ===
In the summer of 2004, he joined Conference Premier side Crawley Town. He started in Crawley's first game of the season, and remained a regular player early in the season. He requested a transfer away from Crawley due to a lack of regular football in February 2005, with Mapes saying, "I am 22 and I need to be playing regular football" and that "if I can't get it at Crawley then I will have to go somewhere else." In March 2005, he joined Canvey Island on loan, before being recalled in April 2005. Mapes was released by Crawley Town at the end of the 2004–05 season after making 36 appearances in all competitions for the club.

=== Later career ===
Following his departure from Crawley Town, Mapes signed for Yeading in June 2005. He joined Hendon on loan until the end of the season in February 2006, where he scored once in 13 league appearances. He subsequently had spells at Hemel Hempstead Town and Barton Rovers before joining Hayes & Yeading United on dual registration in November 2007. In August 2008, he left Hayes & Yeading United, rejoining former club Hendon a few days later, and would go on to make 16 league appearances, scoring twice during this spell.

== International career ==
Having once been called up to the Wales national under-17 team, he was called up to the England C team in October 2004 as part of a provisional 30-man squad for a match against Italy.

== Personal life ==
His brother George also played senior football.
