= Matt Brazier =

English footballer (1976–2019)

Personal information
- Full name: Matthew Ronald Brazier
- Date of birth: 2 July 1976
- Place of birth: Whipps Cross, Leytonstone, England
- Date of death: 4 February 2019 (aged 42)
- Position: Midfielder

Youth career
- Queens Park Rangers

Senior career*
Years	Team	Apps	(Gls)
1994–1998	Queens Park Rangers	49	(2)
1998–1999	Fulham	9	(1)
1998	→ Cardiff City (loan)	11	(2)
1999–2002	Cardiff City	56	(3)
2002–2004	Leyton Orient	46	(2)
Total		171	(10)
- * Club domestic league appearances and goals

Matthew Ronald Brazier (2 July 1976 – 4 February 2019) was an English professional footballer who played as a midfielder. He began his career with Queens Park Rangers before joining fellow London-based side Fulham in 1998. After a brief loan spell at Cardiff City, Brazier joined the Bluebirds on a permanent deal for a fee of £100,000. He helped the club win promotion during the 2000–01 season but fell out of favour under manager Alan Cork and was allowed to join Leyton Orient six months later.

== Career ==
=== Early career ===
Brazier began his career at Queens Park Rangers, making his way through the club's youth system. The 1995–96 season saw him establish himself in the Premier League side; during his time at Queens Park Rangers, he played in both the Premier League and the 1st Division. He left to join neighbours Fulham for the 1998–1999 season. He scored on his first start for the club in a match against Preston North End, but his spell at Fulham was brief as he struggled to make an impact in the side, and he was eventually allowed to go on loan to Cardiff City.

=== Cardiff City ===
His loan spell saw him make 11 appearances for the club and, despite a back injury disrupting his time at the club, his performances persuaded Cardiff to pay £100,000 for him at the end of the 1998–99 season. His first season back at the club did not live up to the expectations set during his loan spell at the club and it was not until his second year that he managed to return to form only for an illness to disrupt his season. He helped the team win promotion to the Second Division during the 2000–01 season as they finished as runners-up to Brighton & Hove Albion.

In the 2001–02 season, Brazier fell out of favour with manager Alan Cork after being told on the first day of pre-season training that he had been placed on the transfer list, along with a number of other players, including Jason Fowler, Scott McCulloch and Andy Thompson, who labelled themselves the "death camp" due to their exclusion from first team activity. He made just one appearance during the season, in October 2001, during a 7–1 victory over Rushden & Diamonds in the Football League Trophy. Brazier became disgruntled with the situation and launched a scathing attack on Cork, stating "I didn't matter if I played out of my skin for the reserves; I wasn't going to get a game at Cardiff this season and Alan Cork made that clear to me at the start. [...] He might say there wasn't a problem between us, but I think there was. I don't think he wanted me anywhere near the club."

Brazier and Kevin Nugent both saw moves to Colchester United collapse in December 2001, but the pair eventually moved to Leyton Orient in January 2002. Brazier spent two years with Leyton Orient before retiring in 2004.

== Death ==
On 4 February 2019, Brazier died, aged 42, following a battle with non-Hodgkin follicular lymphoma.
