= Martyn Giles =

Welsh footballer (born 1983)

Personal information
- Date of birth: 10 April 1983 (age 43)
- Place of birth: Cardiff, Wales
- Positions: Left-back; centre-back

Senior career*
Years	Team	Apps	(Gls)
2000–2003	Cardiff City	5	(0)
2003	Barry Town	2	(0)
2003	Port Talbot Town	6	(0)
2003–2004	Morecambe	0	(0)
2004–2006	Carmarthen Town	61	(4)
2006–2007	Hereford United	13	(0)
2008–2010	Newport County	44	(2)
2010–2013	Llanelli	18	(0)
Total		149	(6)

International career
- Wales U17
2000–2002	Wales U19	4	(0)
- * Club domestic league appearances and goals

Martyn Giles (born 10 April 1983) is a Welsh former professional footballer. He has played for Wales at U17, U19 and semi-professional levels. He is assistant manager of Cymru Premier side Penybont.

== Early life ==
Born in Cardiff, Giles grew up in the Pentwyn area of the city and attended St Teilo's Church in Wales High School.

== Career ==
Giles began his career in the youth system at Cardiff City, the club he supported as a child. Alongside James Collins, he was offered a professional deal at the club and made his senior debut in March 2001 against Hull City as a substitute for Matt Brazier. He scored once for Cardiff against Rushden & Diamonds in the Football League Trophy before having brief spells at Barry Town and Port Talbot Town before joining Morecambe in November 2003. However, he did not play a first team match for the Shrimpers and left soon after. He then joined Carmarthen Town where he was a first team regular. In two seasons, he made over 70 appearances and scored 4 goals in the Welsh Premier League.

On 27 July 2006, he signed for Hereford United. He was a first team regular in the Bulls defence, and was named Fan's Player of the Month for September. However his season was effectively over by the end of October when he suffered two long-term injuries, initially suffering dizziness from a head injury. Once he had recovered he then sustained a back injury which ensured he did not play again in the 2006–07 season, and he was released at the end of the season.

On 26 June 2008 Giles joined Conference South team Newport County. Giles was a regular for Newport in the first half of the 2009–10 season but featured less in the second half of the season as Newport County were crowned Conference South champions with a record 103 points. However, Giles was released by Newport at the end of the season and agreed terms with Welsh Premier League side Llanelli three days later.
