= Lee Kendall =

Welsh footballer and coach

Personal information
- Full name: Lee Mark Kendall
- Date of birth: 8 January 1981 (age 45)
- Place of birth: Newport, Wales
- Position: Goalkeeper

Team information
- Current team: Cardiff City F.C (Head of Academy Goalkeeping and Set Play Development)

Youth career
- 1998–2000: Crystal Palace

Senior career*
Years	Team	Apps	(Gls)
2000–2002	Cardiff City	3	(0)
2000–2001	→ Barry Town United (loan)	14	(0)
2002–2003	Shrewsbury Town	1	(0)
2003–2007	Haverfordwest County	136	(0)
2007–2009	Rhyl	52	(0)
2009–2011	Port Talbot Town	47	(0)
2011–2012	Neath	26	(0)
2012	Prestatyn	3	(0)
Total		278	(0)

Managerial career
- 2022-2023: Barry Town United
- 2024: Bath City (caretaker)
- * Club domestic league appearances and goals

Lee Mark Kendall (born 8 January 1981) is a UEFA Pro Licence Welsh football coach and Wales U21 International. He is currently Head of Academy Goalkeeping and Set Play Development at Cardiff City FC.

== Career ==
Kendall began his playing career in English football, with London-based club Crystal Palace where he also represented Wales at U16, U18, & U21 level. He had a loan spell with Barry Town before joining Welsh side Cardiff City in 2000 in a move worth £50,000. His only senior appearance for Cardiff was a Football League Trophy tie against Rushden & Diamonds. Following his time at Cardiff, Kendall then had a spell at League Two club Shrewsbury Town, before moving into semi-professional football with Welsh Premier League side Haverfordwest County in 2003.

Kendall who also represented Wales at Under-21 level, signed the longest ever contract in the history of the Welsh Premier League intended to last 5 years in 2005 with then Welsh Premier League side Haverfordwest County, but left two years later to gain Champions League football with Rhyl F.C. He later joined fellow Welsh Premier League side Port Talbot Town where he featured in the Europa League. Following a season and a half with Port Talbot Town, Kendall left to take up a coaching role with Sheffield United, but later returned to the Welsh Premier League to sign for Neath in June 2011. At the end of the 2011–12 season, Kendall announced his decision to end his playing career but later returned to help Prestatyn out of a goalkeeping crisis in December 2012 making three appearances for the club.

== Coaching and management career ==
Kendall began his coaching career in 2010 when he was appointed academy goalkeeper coach at then Championship side Sheffield United, where he linked up with fellow Welshman Gary Speed who was manager at Bramall Lane. In 2012, Kendall then made a return to one of his former clubs, Cardiff City, to undertake the role of head academy goalkeeper coach. On 24 May 2013, Kendall was appointed first team goalkeeper coach at Bristol City following recommendation from former Bristol City goalkeeper Tom Heaton who previously worked with Kendall at Cardiff City.

On 24 January 2014, Kendall was appointed as England women's national football team goalkeeper coach signing a four-year contract. Kendall was a key member of the coaching staff when the team won Bronze at the Women's World Cup 2015 in Canada and Euro 2017 semi finals.

In December 2017 Kendall took up the full-time position as Head Coach of the University of South Wales Men's Football team. Kendall led the team to a National title in 2018-19 season going a whole season undefeated. This was the only time in the history of BUCS competition that a University Men's Premier Football team had gone a whole season without losing a single match in league and cup. Kendall also had a National semi-final 2017-18 and quarter-final 2019-20 as Head Coach at USW.

Alongside his role Kendall acts as a Goalkeeping coach for The Football Association of Wales, covering Men's National Youth Teams, a role he started in May 2018. In June 2019 he also covered a Wales Men's Senior camp in Cardiff.

He is a coach educator at UEFA A Goalkeeping and Outfield level for the Football Association of Wales.

Kendall holds UEFA A Licences in Goalkeeping and Outfield coaching, FA Advanced Youth Award.

Kendall also has a BSc in Sport Coaching and a Masters in Performance Coaching.

In February 2020 Kendall was accepted on the UEFA Pro Licence and completed June 2021.

Kendall was appointed Head of Goalkeeping at Fleetwood Town on 28 June 2021. He left the club after only one season due to family reasons. On 12 May 2022 Kendall joined one of his former clubs Barry Town United as Assistant Manager. On 1 June 2022 Kendall was named Head of Football at Cardiff and the Vale College alongside his role at Barry Town United. On the 6th November 2022 Kendall was appointed Barry Town United Manager. Kendall went on to lead Barry Town United to the Cymru South title and the Welsh Blood Service regional and national cup finals.

On 25 July 2023, Kendall resigned as manager after just nine months in charge, despite previously signing a two-year contract with Barry following their promotion back to the Cymru Premier.

In November 2024, Kendall was appointed caretaker manager of Bath City, where he had been goalkeeping coach since September. Following the appointment of Darren Way as manager in December, Kendall remained at the club as assistant manager.

In May 2025, Kendall was appointed head of goalkeeping at League Two club Newport County.

In April 2026 Kendall was announced as Cardiff City Head of Academy Goalkeeping.

== Personal life ==
Lee Kendall is the son of former Wolves & Spurs goalkeeper Mark Kendall.
