= David Hughes (footballer, born 1978) =

Welsh footballer

Personal information
- Full name: Robert David Hughes
- Date of birth: 1 February 1978 (age 48)
- Place of birth: Wrexham, Wales
- Position: Defender

Youth career
- 1993-1994: Cefn Druids F.C.
- 1994–1996: Aston Villa

Senior career*
Years	Team	Apps	(Gls)
1996–1999	Aston Villa	7	(0)
1998	→ Carlisle United (loan)	1	(0)
1999–2001	Shrewsbury Town	46	(3)
2001–2003	Cardiff City	14	(0)
2005	Port Talbot Town	1	(0)
Total		65	(3)

International career
1996–2000	Wales U21	13	(?)
1996–1999	Wales B	2	(0)

Managerial career
- 2003–2004: Barry Town
- 2004: Barry Town
- 2025: Newport County
- * Club domestic league appearances and goals

Robert David Hughes (born 1 February 1978) is a Welsh former footballer who played as a defender. He was most recently head coach of EFL League Two club Newport County.

== Playing career ==
Born in Wrexham, Hughes began his career at Cefn Druids in The Cymru Alliance as a teenager before a move to Aston Villa. He played seven times during the 1996/97 season as a replacement for the injured Steve Staunton. He suffered with minor injuries over the next few years and made just one professional appearance in the following two years, playing in a 1–0 defeat to AFC Bournemouth on 28 March 1999 while on loan to League One side Carlisle United.

Finding his chances at Villa Park limited on his return he joined Shrewsbury Town on a free transfer, making his debut in a 4–1 defeat to Exeter City. He spent two years as a regular first-team choice and, in February 2001, he signed for Cardiff City for a fee of £450,000, £225,000 of which was given to Aston Villa due to a sell on clause, and went straight into the Bluebirds side but injuries struck again and after failing to regain his place in the side he was released in 2003 and subsequently retired.

== Coaching career ==
Hughes was appointed the manager of Barry Town in 2003.

After an 8-0 defeat to Rhyl F.C. in the FAW Premier Cup, Hughes infamously juxtaposed his Barry side to "The Dog and Duck". Hughes said in his post-drubbing BBC Wales interview "If I could sign eleven I would do. I said to them at half time in there, nobody else wants them - that's why they're playing for us, because of our situation. I certainly wouldn't want them in the Welsh Alliance let alone the League of Wales. They'll be playing for the 'Dog And Duck' on a Sunday.

After a short spell in charge he moved into an assistant manager role alongside Colin Addison, who took over as manager in February 2004. However, Addison left the club after just six months in charge and Hughes was re-instated as manager for a short time before he resigned in December 2004, along with the majority of the first-team squad, due to ongoing financial problems at the club.

In 2005, Hughes took a coaching role at Welsh Premier League side Port Talbot Town. He later made one appearance as a substitute for the side during the 2005–06 season.

Hughes later joined English League Two club Shrewsbury Town, spending two years as their head of youth development. He joined Championship side Watford as youth team coach in September 2011. He left the club in August 2014 to take up a position as Assistant Intermediate Team Manager for the Wales under-17 to under-21 sides.

In December 2016, Hughes returned to Aston Villa as Under-18 team manager.

In July 2019, Hughes joined Southampton to become their first Head of Academy Player Development.

In November 2020, Hughes was appointed head of Academy Coaching at Cardiff City and he was promoted to Head of Academy in October 2021.

In August 2022, Hughes was appointed as Professional Development Phase coach at Manchester United under manager Erik ten Hag

On 23 May 2025, Hughes was appointed manager of League Two club Newport County on a two-year deal. On 15 November 2025, Hughes was sacked by Newport shortly after a 1–0 defeat at Shrewsbury Town, with Newport bottom of League Two on 11 points after 16 league games of the 2025-26 season.

== Career statistics ==
Club statistics
Club	Season	League		National Cup		League Cup		Other		Total	
Club	Season	App	Goals	App	Goals	App	Goals	App	Goals	App	Goals
Aston Villa	1996–97	7	0	0	0	0	0	0	0	7	0
Aston Villa	1997–98	0	0	0	0	0	0	0	0	0	0
Aston Villa	1998–99	0	0	0	0	0	0	0	0	0	0
Aston Villa	Subtotal	7	0	0	0	0	0	0	0	7	0
Carlisle United (loan)	1997–98	1	0	0	0	0	0	0	0	1	0
Shrewsbury Town	1999–00	22	1	3	0	0	0	1	0	26	1
Shrewsbury Town	2000–01	24	2	1	0	1	0	1	0	27	2
Shrewsbury Town	Subtotal	46	3	4	0	1	0	2	0	53	3
Cardiff City	2000–01	12	0	0	0	0	0	0	0	12	0
Cardiff City	2001–02	2	0	0	0	1	0	4	0	7	0
Cardiff City	2002–03	0	0	0	0	0	0	0	0	0	0
Cardiff City	Subtotal	14	0	0	0	1	0	4	0	19	0
Port Talbot Town	2005-06	1	0	0	0	0	0	0	0	1	0
Total		67	3	4	0	2	0	6	0	81	3

== Managerial statistics ==
As of 15 November 2025

Managerial record by team and tenure
Team	Nat	From	To	Record							
Team	Nat	From	To	G	W	D	L	GF	GA	GD	Win %
Newport County	(Wales)	23 May 2025	15 November 2025	22	4	4	14	22	36	−14	18.18
Total				22	4	4	14	22	36	−14	18.18
