= Paul Brayson =

English footballer

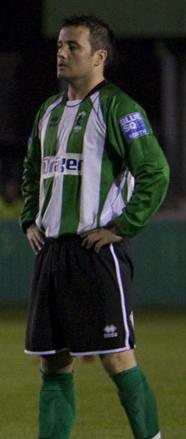
- Brayson playing for Blyth Spartans

Personal information
- Full name: Paul Brayson
- Date of birth: 16 September 1977 (age 49)
- Place of birth: Newcastle upon Tyne, England
- Position: Striker

Senior career*
Years	Team	Apps	(Gls)
1995–1998	Newcastle United	0	(0)
1997	→ Swansea City (loan)	11	(5)
1998–2000	Reading	42	(1)
2000	→ Cardiff City (loan)	9	(1)
2000–2002	Cardiff City	75	(18)
2002–2004	Cheltenham Town	51	(8)
2004–2007	Northwich Victoria	108	(42)
2005	→ Gateshead (loan)	2	(2)
2007–2008	York City	22	(4)
2008	Gateshead	19	(9)
2008–2009	Newcastle Blue Star	38	(29)
2009	Durham City	4	(3)
2009–2011	Blyth Spartans	77	(59)
2011–2012	Harrogate Town	27	(12)
2012–2013	Bedlington Terriers	5	(9)
2013–2024	Newcastle Benfield	246	(281)

International career
2007	England C	1	(0)

Managerial career
- 2025–2026: Newcastle Blue Star
- * Club domestic league appearances and goals as of 21:00, 13 January 2023 (UTC)

Paul Brayson (born 16 September 1977) is a retired English footballer who most famously played for Newcastle Benfield as a striker.

Brayson is widely regarded as a Newcastle Benfield legend, scoring over 250 goals in his first 8 seasons with the club, and winning Northern League Player of the Season in both 2014/2015 and 2017/2018 seasons.

== Club career ==
Born in Newcastle upon Tyne, Brayson started his career with Newcastle United before moving to Swansea City on loan. He signed for Reading in March 1998 for a fee of £1 He joined Cardiff City on loan in 2000.

He then moved Cardiff City on a free transfer in 2000. He moved to Cheltenham Town in July 2002. He was released at the end of 2003–04 season. He had a trial at York City in July 2004, but manager Chris Brass decided not to give him a contract.

He dropped out of The Football League when he moved to Northwich Victoria in August 2004. This allowed him to play part-time for Cheshire club while running a taxi business in his native Newcastle. He joined Gateshead on loan in March 2005. He was back at Northwich for the 2005–06 season, where he scored 32 goals in 51 appearances in Conference North. He participated in a fine FA Cup run with Northwich, before being knocked out by Premier League club Sunderland. During that FA Cup run, Brayson won the FA Player of the Round twice, becoming the first player to do so. He was regarded as a fans favourite with the Northwich supporters.

Brayson was signed by York City on 25 June 2007. He was believed to have turned down a loan move to Gateshead in January 2008. He made 22 appearances in the Conference Premier for York, scoring four goals, prior to being released on 30 January 2008. He signed for Gateshead on 31 January.

The end of the 2007–08 season saw Brayson offered a new contract by Gateshead. At the same time Newcastle Blue Star made him a lucrative offer to drop down two leagues and play for them. On 2 June 2008 Brayson was released by Gateshead having failed to agree to the new contract by a set deadline. Upon his release by Gateshead, Brayson accepted the contract on offer from Newcastle Blue Star. He left to join Durham City in June 2009 before signing for Blyth Spartans in August 2009. In his first season in the Conference North he finished the league's top goal scorer with 28 goals.

In May 2010 he signed a new deal with Blyth Spartans for season 2010/2011 and went on to win the golden boot.

In August 2010 he was named team captain for season 2010/2011 and ended the campaign as the club's top goalscorer for a second successive season.

In May 2011 he joined Harrogate Town

In June 2012 he joined Bedlington Terriers.

In August 2013 Brayson joined Newcastle Benfield.

== International career ==
Brayson was a late call-up for the England national C team to play in the Four Nations Tournament in May 2007, as a replacement for the injured Matt Tubbs. He was capped once, playing in a 3–0 win over Scotland on 25 May 2007. England won the tournament, having been unbeaten and not conceded a goal in three matches.
