= Scott McCulloch =

Scottish footballer

Personal information
- Full name: Scott Anderson James McCulloch
- Date of birth: 29 November 1975 (age 50)
- Place of birth: Cumnock, Scotland
- Position: Defender

Youth career
- 1992–1994: Rangers

Senior career*
Years	Team	Apps	(Gls)
1994–1995	Rangers	0	(0)
1995–1997	Hamilton Academical	52	(3)
1997–1999	Dunfermline Athletic	37	(1)
1999–2000	Dundee United	25	(0)
2000–2002	Cardiff City	27	(1)
2002	Airdrieonians	3	(0)
2002–2003	Forfar Athletic	46	(3)
2003–2004	Brechin City	35	(2)
2004–2005	Ayr United	11	(2)
2005–2007	Partick Thistle	59	(12)
2007–2008	Stenhousemuir	24	(0)
Total		319	(24)
- * Club domestic league appearances and goals

Scott Anderson James McCulloch (born 29 November 1975) is a Scottish former footballer.
