= 2006–07 Cardiff City F.C. season =

Welsh football club season

Cardiff City
2006–07 season
- Chairman: Sam Hammam (until December); Peter Ridsdale
- Manager: Dave Jones
- Championship: 13th
- FA Cup: Third Round
- League Cup: First Round
- Top goalscorer: League: Michael Chopra (22); All: Michael Chopra (22)
- Highest home attendance: 20,376 vs Tottenham Hotspur (7 January 2006)
- Lowest home attendance: 11,549 vs Barnsley (2 February 2006)
- Average home league attendance: 15,224

During the 2006–07 season Cardiff City played in the Football League Championship. It was the team's fourth year in the Championship since being promoted from League One. The season also saw a change of chairman at the club when Sam Hammam handed over control to Peter Ridsdale.

== Season review ==
=== Kit ===
The kits were designed by Spanish company Joma. It was the first season they were sponsored by Communications Direct.

=== Events ===
- 31 May 2006 – Cardiff break their record for highest fee received for a player with the sale of Cameron Jerome to Birmingham City for £3 million.
- 22 December 2006 – Sam Hammam sells the club to Peter Ridsdale for £27 million.

=== League ===
The opening game saw Cardiff win 2–1 over Barnsley on 5 August 2006 before Cardiff fans saw Michael Chopra score his first competitive goal for Cardiff in a 1–0 win over Coventry City. City were undefeated through August four wins and one draw against West Bromwich Albion. Their first loss came at Deepdale in a 2–1 defeat against Preston North End where Chopra scored his second league goal. The side's next win did not come until two games later in a 4–1 win over Luton Town at Ninian Park, going on to win their next four games when Norwich City ended the winning streak. After a 1–0 win over Burnley, Cardiff went four games without scoring, drawing two of these and losing the other two.

On 9 December 2006 Darren Purse scored their first goal since the win over Burnley against Ipswich Town which ended in a 2–2 draw. On 20 January 2007 Cardiff broke their poor run of form after going eleven games without a win with a 2–1 win over Wolverhampton Wanderers. They then went undefeated until a month later on 20 February 2007 this time West Bromwich Albion ended Cardiff's run but the side were still mid-table. Even though they hit straight back with a win over Preston North End, another loss to Birmingham City then a 1–0 win over Norwich City was followed by a winless streak which lasted until the end of the season, finishing in 13th place.

=== FA Cup ===
Cardiff entered in the 3rd Round in a home game against Premier League side Tottenham Hotspur on 7 January 2007. A 0–0 draw at Ninian Park took the tie to a replay at White Hart Lane on 17 January which saw Cardiff lose 4–0.

=== League Cup ===
In the first round of the League Cup, Cardiff were drawn against League Two side Barnet but a team made up of reserve and youth players were beaten 2–0.

=== FAW Cup ===
Cardiff beat Carmarthen Town in the quarter-finals before being eliminated by The New Saints in the semi-finals.

== First-team squad ==
No.	Name	Pos.	Nat.	Place of birth	Age	Apps	Goals	Signed from	Date signed	Fee	Ends
Goalkeepers
1	Neil Alexander	GK	(Scotland)	Edinburgh	29	234	0	Livingston	28 May 2001	£200,000	2007
13	Mark Howard	GK	(England)	Southwark	20	2	0	Arsenal	1 June 2006	Free	2007
15	David Forde	GK	(Republic of Ireland)	Galway	27	8	0	Derry City	5 December 2006	Free	2009
23	Martyn Margetson	GK	(Wales)	Neath	35	41	0	Huddersfield Town	3 August 2002	Free	2007
Defenders
2	Kerrea Gilbert	RB	(England)	Brent	20	27	0	Arsenal	21 July 2006	Loan	2007
3	Kevin McNaughton	RB	(Scotland)	Dundee	24	44	0	Aberdeen	26 May 2006	Free	2009
5	Darren Purse	CB	(England)	Tower Hamlets	30	76	8	West Bromwich Albion	28 July 2005	£1,000,000	2009
6	Glenn Loovens	CB	(Netherlands)	Doetinchem	23	68	4	Feyenoord	9 May 2006	£250,000	2009
12	Roger Johnson	CB	(England)	Ashford	20	33	2	Wycombe Wanderers	4 July 2006	£275,000	2009
21	Chris Barker	LB	(England)	Sheffield	27	180	0	Barnsley	12 July 2002	£500,000	2007
44	Chris Gunter	RB	(Wales)	Newport	17	18	0	Academy	1 August 2006	Trainee	2008
Defenders
4	Jeff Whitley	CM	(Northern Ireland)	(Zambia) Ndola	28	39	1	Sunderland	1 July 2005	Free	2007
7	Peter Whittingham	LM	(England)	Nuneaton	22	19	4	Aston Villa	11 January 2007	£350,000	2009
10	Stephen McPhail	CM	(Republic of Ireland)	(England) Westminster	27	45	0	Barnsley	13 June 2006	Free	2008
11	Paul Parry	LM	(Wales)	Chepstow	26	118	12	Hereford United	9 January 2004	£75,000	2008
14	Willo Flood	CM	(Republic of Ireland)	Dublin	22	30	1	Manchester City	2 August 2006	£200,000	2009
16	Joe Ledley	LM	(Wales)	Cardiff	20	126	10	Academy	1 September 2004	Trainee	2009
17	Kevin Cooper	LM	(England)	Derby	32	44	2	Wolverhampton Wanderers	26 July 2005	Free	2007
19	Riccardo Scimeca	CM	(England)	Leamington Spa	32	55	6	West Bromwich Albion	13 January 2006	Free	2008
26	Aaron Ramsey	LM	(Wales)	Caerphilly	16	1	0	Academy	1 June 2006	Trainee	2007
30	Curtis McDonald	LM	(Wales)	Cardiff	19	2	2	Academy	1 June 2006	Trainee	2007
35	Simon Walton	CM	(England)	Leeds	19	7	0	Charlton Athletic	January 2007	Loan	2007
40	Darcy Blake	DM	(Wales)	New Tredegar	18	13	0	Academy	1 July 2005	Trainee	2009
Forwards
8	Michael Chopra	CF	(England)	Newcastle upon Tyne	23	44	22	Newcastle United	14 June 2006	£500,000	2009
9	Steve Thompson	CF	(Scotland)	Paisley	28	59	10	Rangers	10 January 2006	£250,000	2008
18	Luigi Glombard	CF	(France)	Montreuil-sous-Bois	22	7	0	Nantes	July 2006	Free	2007
20	Kevin Campbell	CF	(England)	Lambeth	37	21	1	West Bromwich Albion	2 August 2006	Free	2007
25	Iwan Redan	CF	(Netherlands)	Rotterdam	26	3	0	Willem II	January 2007	Loan	2007
26	Andrea Ferretti	CF	(Italy)	Parma	20	9	0	Parma	25 July 2005	Free	2007
27	Jason Byrne	CF	(Republic of Ireland)	Dublin	29	11	1	Shelbourne	17 January 2007	£75,000	2009
29	Jamal Easter	CF	(Wales)	Cardiff	19	0	0	Academy	1 June 2006	Free	2007
36	Matt Green	CF	(England)	Bath	20	6	0	Newport County	31 January 2007	£10,000	2009
37	Warren Feeney	CF	(Northern Ireland)	Belfast	26	6	0	Luton Town	March 2007	Loan	2007

== Squad statistics ==
No.	Pos	Nat	Player	Total		Championship		FA Cup		League Cup		FAW Premier Cup	
No.	Pos	Nat	Player	Apps	Goals	Apps	Goals	Apps	Goals	Apps	Goals	Apps	Goals
1	GK	(Scotland) SCO	Neil Alexander	41	0	39	0	2	0	0	0	0	0
2	DF	(England) ENG	Kerrea Gilbert	27	0	21+3	0	2	0	0	0	1	0
3	DF	(Scotland) SCO	Kevin McNaughton	44	0	39+3	0	2	0	0	0	0	0
4	MF	(Northern Ireland) NIR	Jeff Whitley	0	0	0	0	0	0	0	0	0	0
5	DF	(England) ENG	Darren Purse	33	4	31	4	2	0	0	0	0	0
6	DF	(Netherlands) NED	Glenn Loovens	32	2	30	2	2	0	0	0	0	0
7	MF	(England) ENG	Peter Whittingham	19	4	18+1	4	0	0	0	0	0	0
8	FW	(England) ENG	Michael Chopra	44	22	42	22	2	0	0	0	0	0
9	FW	(Scotland) SCO	Steve Thompson	45	6	39+4	6	2	0	0	0	0	0
10	MF	(Republic of Ireland) IRL	Stephen McPhail	45	0	43	0	2	0	0	0	0	0
11	MF	(Wales) WAL	Paul Parry	43	6	41+1	6	0	0	0+1	0	0	0
12	DF	(England) ENG	Roger Johnson	33	2	26+6	2	0	0	1	0	0	0
13	GK	(England) ENG	Mark Howard	2	0	0	0	0	0	1	0	1	0
14	MF	(Republic of Ireland) IRL	Willo Flood	30	1	5+20	1	2	0	1	0	2	0
15	GK	(Republic of Ireland) IRL	David Forde	8	0	7	0	0	0	0	0	1	0
16	MF	(Wales) WAL	Joe Ledley	49	3	46	3	2	0	0+1	0	0	0
17	MF	(England) ENG	Kevin Cooper	7	0	0+4	0	0+1	0	1	0	1	0
18	FW	(France) FRA	Luigi Glombard	7	0	1+5	0	0	0	1	0	0	0
19	MF	(England) ENG	Riccardo Scimeca	37	5	35	5	2	0	0	0	0	0
20	FW	(England) ENG	Kevin Campbell	21	1	4+15	0	0	0	1	0	1	1
22	DF	(England) ENG	James Chambers	7	0	7	0	0	0	0	0	0	0
22	MF	(Republic of Ireland) IRL	James Simmonds	1	0	0	0	0	0	0	0	1	0
22	DF	(Wales) WAL	Rhys Weston	1	0	0	0	0	0	1	0	0	0
22	DF	(England) ENG	Alan Wright	7	0	6+1	0	0	0	0	0	0	0
25	MF	(England) ENG	Malvin Kamara	16	1	3+12	1	0	0	1	0	0	0
25	FW	(Netherlands) NED	Iwan Redan	3	0	0+2	0	0	0	0	0	1	0
26	FW	(Italy) ITA	Andrea Ferretti	4	0	0+1	0	0+1	0	0	0	2	0
26	MF	(Wales) WAL	Aaron Ramsey	1	0	0+1	0	0	0	0	0	0	0
27	FW	(Republic of Ireland) IRL	Jason Byrne	11	1	2+8	1	0	0	0	0	1	0
28	DF	(Wales) WAL	Joe Jacobson	1	0	0	0	0	0	1	0	0	0
30	MF	(Wales) WAL	Curtis McDonald	2	2	0	0	0	0	0	0	2	2
35	MF	(England) ENG	Simon Walton	7	0	5+1	0	0	0	0	0	1	0
36	FW	(England) ENG	Matt Green	6	0	6	0	0	0	0	0	0	0
37	FW	(Northern Ireland) NIR	Warren Feeney	6	0	0+6	0	0	0	0	0	0	0
40	MF	(Wales) WAL	Darcy Blake	12	0	3+7	0	0	0	0+1	0	1	0
44	DF	(Wales) WAL	Chris Gunter	18	0	9+6	0	0	0	1	0	2	0

== Transfers ==
=== Summer transfer window ins ===
Date	#	Player	Club	Fee
27 April 2006	6	(Netherlands) Glenn Loovens	(Netherlands) Feyenoord	£250,000
26 May 2006	3	(Scotland) Kevin McNaughton	(Scotland) Aberdeen	Free
1 June 2006	13	Mark Howard	Arsenal	Free
14 June 2006	8	Michael Chopra	Newcastle United	£500,000
4 July 2006	12	Roger Johnson	Wycombe Wanderers	£275,000
5 July 2006	25	(Sierra Leone) Malvin Kamara	Milton Keynes Dons	Free
5 July 2006	24	Nick McKoy	Milton Keynes Dons	Free
21 July 2006	18	(France) Luigi Glombard	(France) Nantes	Free
2 August 2006	20	Kevin Campbell	West Bromwich Albion	Free
2 August 2006	14	(Republic of Ireland) Willo Flood	Manchester City	Undisclosed

=== January transfer window ins ===
Player	Club	Fee
(Republic of Ireland) Jason Byrne	(Republic of Ireland) Shelbourne	£75,000
(Republic of Ireland) David Forde	(Republic of Ireland) Derry City	Free
Matt Green	(Wales) Newport County	£10,000
Peter Whittingham	Aston Villa	£350,000

=== Loans in ===
Player	Club	Arrival date	Return date
Kerrea Gilbert	Arsenal	21 July	End of season
James Chambers	Watford	13 October	13 November
Alan Wright	Sheffield United	23 November	1 January
James Simmonds	Chelsea	16 January	End of season
(Netherlands) Iwan Redan	(Netherlands) Willem II	30 January	End of season
Simon Walton	Charlton Athletic	31 January	End of season
(Northern Ireland) Warren Feeney	Luton Town	22 March	End of season

=== Summer transfer window outs ===
Player	Club	Fee
(Wales) Neal Ardley	Millwall	Free
Willie Boland	Hartlepool United*	Free
Andy Campbell	(Scotland) Dunfermline Athletic	Undisclosed
Neil Cox	Crewe Alexandra*	Free
Jermaine Darlington	AFC Wimbledon*	Free
Nicky Fish	Released	–
Cameron Jerome	Birmingham City	£3m
Guylain Ndumbu-Nsungu	Gillingham*	Free
Daniel Parslow	York City*	Free
Lee Worgan	Eastbourne Borough*	Free
(Wales) Rhys Weston	Released	–

=== January transfer window outs ===
Player	Club	Fee
(Sierra Leone) Malvin Kamara	Port Vale	Free
(Northern Ireland) Philip Mulryne	Leyton Orient	Free

=== Loans out ===
Player	Club	Departure date	End date
(Northern Ireland) Jeff Whitley	Stoke City	18 August	December
Joe Jacobson	Accrington Stanley	23 November	16 January
Mark Howard	(Wales) Swansea City	January 2007	End of Season
(Wales) Jamal Easter	Torquay United	5 January	5 February
Nick McKoy	Torquay United	5 January	End of season
Michael Corcoran	Oxford United	30 January	29 April
(France) Luigi Glombard	Leicester City	31 January	11 February
Joe Jacobson	Bristol Rovers	15 February	End of season
(Northern Ireland) Jeff Whitley	(Wales) Wrexham	16 February	End of season
(France) Luigi Glombard	Oldham Athletic	22 March	20 May
(Wales) Gregg Coombes	Oxford United	March 2007	End of Season

== Standings ==
Pos	Team	Pld	W	D	L	GF	GA	GD	Pts
11	Plymouth Argyle	46	17	16	13	63	62	+1	67
12	Crystal Palace	46	18	11	17	59	51	+8	65
13	Cardiff City	46	17	13	16	57	53	+4	64
14	Ipswich Town	46	18	8	20	64	59	+5	62
15	Burnley	46	15	12	19	52	49	+3	57

Source: RSSSF
Rules for classification: In the Football League goals scored (F) takes precedence over goal difference (GD).

=== Results by round ===
Round	1	2	3	4	5	6	7	8	9	10	11	12	13	14	15	16	17	18	19	20	21	22	23	24	25	26	27	28	29	30	31	32	33	34	35	36	37	38	39	40	41	42	43	44	45	46
Ground	A	H	H	A	H	A	A	H	A	H	A	H	A	H	A	A	H	H	A	A	H	H	A	A	H	H	A	H	A	H	H	A	H	A	H	A	H	A	A	H	H	A	H	A	H	A
Result	W	D	W	W	W	L	D	W	W	W	W	W	L	D	W	L	W	L	D	L	D	D	L	D	D	D	D	L	W	W	W	D	W	L	W	L	W	D	L	L	L	L	D	L	L	L
Position			4	2	1	1	2	1	1	1	1	1	1	1	1	1	1	1	1	2	3	3	5	6	5	8	8	8	6	6	6	6	7	7	4	7	6	7	7	8	9	10	11	11	11	13
Points	3	4	7	10	13	13	14	17	20	23	26	29	29	30	33	33	36	36	37	37	38	39	39	40	41	42	43	43	46	49	52	53	56	56	59	59	62	63	63	63	63	63	64	64	64	64

A = Away; H = Home; W = Win; D = Draw; L = Loss

== Fixtures and results ==
=== Championship ===
5 August 2006 1	Barnsley	1–2	Cardiff City	Barnsley
	Brian Howard 31'		19' Joe Ledley; 22' Steve Thompson	Stadium: Oakwell; Attendance: 12,082; Referee: Lee Mason (Bolton)

8 August 2006 2	Cardiff City	1–1	West Bromwich Albion	Cardiff
	Riccardo Scimeca 33'		4' Zoltan Gera	Stadium: Ninian Park; Attendance: 18,506; Referee: Chris Foy (Lancashire)

12 August 2006 3	Cardiff City	1–0	Coventry City	Cardiff
	Michael Chopra 79'			Stadium: Ninian Park; Attendance: 13,965; Referee: Russell Booth (Nottinghamshire)

19 August 2006 4	Leeds United	0–1	Cardiff City	Leeds
			83' Willo Flood	Stadium: Elland Road; Attendance: 18,246; Referee: Nigel Miller (Co Durham)

26 August 2006 5	Cardiff City	2–0	Birmingham City	Cardiff
13:00	Joe Ledley 12'; Paul Parry 75'			Stadium: Ninian Park; Attendance: 20,109; Referee: Phil Crossley (Kent)

9 September 2006 6	Preston North End	2–1	Cardiff City	Preston
15:00	Patrick Agyemang 48'; Danny Pugh 65'		51' Michael Chopra	Stadium: Deepdale; Attendance: 12,435; Referee: Eddie Ilderton (Tyne and Wear)

12 September 2006 7	Plymouth Argyle	3–3	Cardiff City	Plymouth
19:45	Kevin McNaughton 69' (o.g.); Barry Hayles 74'; Darren Purse 88' (o.g.)		8' Steve Thompson; 29', 49' Michael Chopra	Stadium: Home Park; Attendance: 11,655; Referee: Steve Tanner (East Sussex)

16 September 2006 8	Cardiff City	4–1	Luton Town	Cardiff
15:00	Darren Purse 10' (pen.); Paul Parry; Michael Chopra 58', 77'	Luton report	45' Rowan Vine	Stadium: Ninian Park; Attendance: 14,108; Referee: Paul Melin (Surrey)

24 September 2006 9	Southend United	0–3	Cardiff City	Southend
13:15			11' Darren Purse; 45' Riccardo Scimeca; 65' Joe Ledley	Stadium: Roots Hall; Attendance: 7,901; Referee: Keith Stroud (Dorset)

30 September 2006 10	Cardiff City	4–0	Wolverhampton Wanderers	Cardiff
	Riccardo Scimeca 40'; Jody Craddock 50' (o.g.); Malvin Kamara 70'; Paul Parry 78'			Stadium: Ninian Park; Attendance: 19,915; Referee: Pat Miller (Bedfordshire)

14 October 2006 11	Crystal Palace	1–2	Cardiff City	London
	Stuart Green 40'		2' Michael Chopra; 84' Riccardo Scimeca	Stadium: Selhurst Park; Attendance: 18,876; Referee: Peter Walton (Northamptonshire)

17 October 2006 12	Cardiff City	1–0	Southampton	Cardiff
	Steve Thompson 84'			Stadium: Ninian Park; Attendance: 19,345; Referee: Ray Olivier (Sutton Coldfield)

21 October 2006 13	Norwich City	1–0	Cardiff City	Norwich
	Dickson Etuhu 7'			Stadium: Carrow Road; Attendance: 25,014; Referee: Anthony Bates (Stoke-on-Trent)

28 October 2006 14	Cardiff City	2–2	Derby County	Cardiff
	Glenn Loovens 52'; Michael Chopra 74'		66' Steve Howard; 90' Giles Barnes	Stadium: Ninian Park; Attendance: 17,371; Referee: Andre Marriner (Birmingham)

31 October 2006 15	Sunderland	1–2	Cardiff City	Sunderland
	Chris Brown 10'		4' Michael Chopra; 37' Michael Chopra	Stadium: Stadium of Light; Attendance: 26,528; Referee: Carl Boyeson (East Yorkshire)

4 November 2006 16	Colchester United	3–1	Cardiff City	Colchester
15:00	Kevin McLeod 49'; Jamie Guy 84'; Jamie Cureton 90' (pen.)	Colchester report	66' Michael Chopra	Stadium: Layer Road; Attendance: 5,393; Referee: Jon Moss (Yorkshire)

11 November 2006 17	Cardiff City	1–0	Burnley	Cardiff
15:00	Riccardo Scimeca 23'			Stadium: Ninian Park; Attendance: 15,744; Referee: Peter Walton (Northamptonshire)

17 November 2006 18	Cardiff City	0–1	Queens Park Rangers	Cardiff
			Ray Jones	Stadium: Ninian Park; Attendance: 13,250; Referee: Phil Joslin (Nottinghamshire)

25 November 2006 19	Sheffield Wednesday	0–0	Cardiff City	Sheffield
				Stadium: Hillsborough; Attendance: 23,935; Referee: Phil Dowd (Stoke-on-Trent)

28 November 2006 20	Stoke City	3–0	Cardiff City	Stoke
	Ricardo Fuller 60'; Liam Lawrence 63'; Mamady Sidibe 65'			Stadium: Britannia Stadium; Attendance: 15,039; Referee: Mike Riley (West Yorkshire)

2 December 2006 21	Cardiff City	0–0	Colchester United	Cardiff
15:00		Colchester report		Stadium: Ninian Park; Attendance: 13,512; Referee: Andy Hall (West Midlands)

9 December 2006 22	Cardiff City	2–2	Ipswich Town	Cardiff
15:00	Darren Purse 3', 66' (pen.)	Ipswich report	48' Jon Macken; 73' (pen.) Jon Macken	Stadium: Ninian Park; Attendance: 16,015; Referee: Andy Hall (West Midlands)

16 December 2006 23	Hull City	4–1	Cardiff City	Hull
	Damien Delaney 6'; Dean Marney 9'; Craig Fagan 36'; Michael Bridges 71'		55' Michael Chopra	Stadium: KC Stadium; Attendance: 23,089; Referee: Andy D'Urso (Billericay)

23 December 2006 24	Leicester City	0–0	Cardiff City	Leicester
				Stadium: Walkers Stadium; Attendance: 22,274; Referee: Anthony Bates (Stoke-on-Trent)

26 December 2006 25	Cardiff City	2–2	Plymouth Argyle	Cardiff
13:00	Steve Thompson 47', 52'		34', 59' David Norris	Stadium: Ninian Park; Attendance: 17,299; Referee: Peter Walton (Northamptonshire)

30 December 2006 26	Cardiff City	0–0	Crystal Palace	Cardiff
				Stadium: Ninian Park; Attendance: 13,704; Referee: Mike Jones (Chester)

1 January 2007 27	Luton Town	0–0	Cardiff City	Luton
15:00		Luton report		Stadium: Kenilworth Road; Attendance: 8,004; Referee: Alan Wiley (Staffordshire)

13 January 2007 28	Cardiff City	0–1	Southend United	Cardiff
			23' Lee Bradbury	Stadium: Ninian Park; Attendance: 13,822; Referee: Steve Tanner (East Sussex)

20 January 2007 29	Wolverhampton Wanderers	1–2	Cardiff City	Wolverhampton
	Seyi Olofinjana 58'		27' Michael Chopra; 88' Jason Byrne	Stadium: Molineux; Attendance: 16,772; Referee: Jon Moss (Yorkshire)

27 January 2007 30	Cardiff City	3–2	Leicester City	Cardiff
	Michael Chopra 21', 57', 69'		71' Paddy Kisnorbo; 89' Elvis Hammond	Stadium: Ninian Park; Attendance: 12,057; Referee: Keith Stroud (Dorset)

2 February 2007 31	Cardiff City	2–0	Barnsley	Cardiff
	Peter Whittingham 11'; Michael Chopra 44'			Stadium: Ninian Park; Attendance: 11,549; Referee: Anthony Bates (Stoke-on-Trent)

10 February 2007 32	Coventry City	2–2	Cardiff City	Coventry
	Leon McKenzie 8'; Dele Adebola 71'		45' (pen.) Michael Chopra; 58' Peter Whittingham	Stadium: Ricoh Arena; Attendance: 17,107; Referee: Graham Poll (Hertfordshire)

17 February 2007 33	Cardiff City	1–0	Leeds United	Cardiff
	Michael Chopra 45'			Stadium: Ninian Park; Attendance: 13,276; Referee: Mark Clattenburg (Durham)

20 February 2007 34	West Bromwich Albion	1–0	Cardiff City	West Bromwich
	Nathan Ellington 66'			Stadium: The Hawthorns; Attendance: 18,802; Referee: Graham Laws (Northumberland)

23 February 2007 35	Cardiff City	4–1	Preston North End	Cardiff
	Peter Whittingham 44'; Michael Chopra 52' (pen.), 67'; Glenn Loovens 54'		53' (pen.) Graham Alexander	Stadium: Ninian Park; Attendance: 12,889; Referee: Trevor Kettle (Berkshire)

4 March 2007 36	Birmingham City	1–0	Cardiff City	Birmingham
	Seb Larsson 56'			Stadium: St Andrew's; Attendance: 28,223; Referee: Kevin Friend (Leicestershire)

10 March 2007 37	Cardiff City	1–0	Norwich City	Cardiff
	Paul Parry 3'			Stadium: Ninian Park; Attendance: 13,276; Referee: Graham Salisbury (Lancashire)

13 March 2007 38	Southampton	2–2	Cardiff City	Southampton
	Chris Baird 30'; Bradley Wright-Phillips 44'		61' Steve Thompson; 85' Peter Whittingham	Stadium: St Mary's Stadium; Attendance: 20,383; Referee: Iain Williamson (Berkshire)

17 March 2007 39	Derby County	3–1	Cardiff City	Derby
	Steve Howard 28' (pen.), 60'; Giles Barnes 49'		32' Paul Parry	Stadium: Pride Park; Attendance: 27,689; Referee: Martin Atkinson (West Yorkshire)

31 March 2007 40	Cardiff City	0–1	Sunderland	Cardiff
			72' Ross Wallace	Stadium: Ninian Park; Attendance: 19,353; Referee: Andy D'Urso (Billericay)

7 April 2007 41	Cardiff City	1–2	Sheffield Wednesday	Cardiff
	Roger Johnson 45'		39' Leon Clarke; 67' Deon Burton	Stadium: Ninian Park; Attendance: 13,621; Referee: Mike Russell (Hertfordshire)

9 April 2007 42	Burnley	2–0	Cardiff City	Burnley
15:00	Steve Jones 4'; Paul McVeigh 48'			Stadium: Turf Moor; Attendance: 11,347; Referee: Richard Beeby (Northampton)

14 April 2007 43	Cardiff City	1–1	Stoke City	Cardiff
	Michael Chopra 90'		30' Carl Hoefkens	Stadium: Ninian Park; Attendance: 11,664; Referee: Graham Laws (Northumberland)

21 April 2007 44	Queens Park Rangers	1–0	Cardiff City	London
	Dexter Blackstock 23'			Stadium: Loftus Road; Attendance: 12,710; Referee: Mick Thorpe (Suffolk)

28 April 2007 45	Cardiff City	0–1	Hull City	Cardiff
			52' Dean Windass	Stadium: Ninian Park; Attendance: 12,421; Referee: Kevin Friend (Leicestershire)

6 May 2007 46	Ipswich Town	3–1	Cardiff City	Ipswich
13:00	Francis Jeffers 4'; Jon Walters 68', 79'	Ipswich report	37' Paul Parry	Stadium: Portman Road; Attendance: 26,488; Referee: Keith Stroud (Dorset)

=== FA Cup ===
7 January 2007 Round 3	Cardiff City	0–0	Tottenham Hotspur	Cardiff
16:00				Stadium: Ninian Park; Attendance: 20,376; Referee: Howard Webb (Yorkshire)

17 January 2007 Round 3 (replay)	Tottenham Hotspur	4–0	Cardiff City	London
20:00	Aaron Lennon 27'; Robbie Keane 30'; Steed Malbranque 41'; Jermain Defoe 81'	BBC report		Stadium: White Hart Lane; Attendance: 27,641; Referee: Mike Riley (West Yorkshire)

=== League Cup ===
22 August 2006 Round 1	Cardiff City	0–2	Barnet	Cardiff
		BBC report	32', 54' Tresor Kandol	Stadium: Ninian Park; Attendance: 3,305; Referee: Andy Penn (West Midlands)

=== FAW Premier Cup ===
13 February 2007 Quarter Final	Carmarthen Town	2–3 (a.e.t.)	Cardiff City	Carmarthen
20:00	Paul Fowler 31'; Danny Thomas 51'	BBC report	65' Kevin Campbell; 90', 103' Curtis McDonald	Stadium: Richmond Park, Carmarthen; Attendance: 710; Referee: Mark Whitby (Swansea)

27 February 2007 Semi Final	Cardiff City	0–1	The New Saints	Cardiff
		BBC report	56' Mike Wilde	Stadium: Ninian Park

== Awards ==
- Football League Championship Apprentice of the Year: Chris Gunter

== See also ==
- Cardiff City F.C. seasons
- 2006–07 in English football
