= 2005–06 Cardiff City F.C. season =

Welsh football club season

Cardiff City
2005–06 season
- Chairman: Sam Hammam
- Manager: Dave Jones
- Championship: 11th
- FA Cup: Third round
- League Cup: Third round
- FAW Premier Cup: Quarter-finals
- Top goalscorer: League: Cameron Jerome (18); All: Cameron Jerome (20)
- Highest home attendance: 16,403 vs Plymouth Argyle (26 December 2005)
- Lowest home attendance: 8,724 vs Ipswich Town (26 November 2005)
- Average home league attendance: 11,802

During the 2005–06 season Cardiff City played in the Football League Championship. It was the club's third year in the Championship since being promoted from League One.

== Season review ==
=== Kit ===
Cardiff ended a 3-year deal with Puma and changed to Spanish company Joma. Housing firm Redrow continued as the main shirt sponsor.

=== League ===
Cardiff began their season with 1–0 loss to Ipswich Town but bounced back with a win at Leeds United before going four games without a win, breaking the streak with consecutive wins over Leicester City and Crystal Palace. On 22 October Cardiff recorded their biggest win of the season with a 6–1 victory over Crewe Alexandra but this was followed by two draws and a loss and by Christmas the sides form had seen them win just three out of thirteen games since the end of October.

The new year saw a continuation of Cardiff's poor form with a 5–1 defeat against Reading. Six wins from the final eighteen games of the season left Cardiff with a 12th-place finish.

=== League Cup ===
Cardiff entered in round one, beating Colchester United 2–0 at the Colchester Community Stadium. They claimed a victory in the second round over Macclesfield Town before being eliminated by Leicester City in the third round.

=== FA Cup ===
Cardiff were drawn against Premier League side Arsenal after entering the competition in the third round, suffering a 2–1 defeat at the Arsenal Stadium on 7 January.

== Squad statistics ==
No.	Pos	Nat	Player	Total		Championship		FA Cup		League Cup		FAW Premier Cup	
No.	Pos	Nat	Player	Apps	Goals	Apps	Goals	Apps	Goals	Apps	Goals	Apps	Goals
1	GK	(Scotland) SCO	Neil Alexander	48	0	46	0	1	0	1	0	0	0
2	DF	(England) ENG	Jermaine Darlington	10	0	7+2	0	0	0	0	0	1	0
3	DF	(England) ENG	Chris Barker	45	0	41	0	1	0	3	0	0	0
4	MF	(Northern Ireland) NIR	Jeff Whitley	38	0	32+2	0	1	0	3	0	0	0
5	DF	(England) ENG	Darren Purse	43	6	39	5	1	0	3	1	0	0
6	DF	(England) ENG	Neil Cox	29	2	21+6	2	1	0	1	0	0	0
7	MF	(England) ENG	Neal Ardley	33	0	22+8	0	1	0	1+1	0	0	0
8	MF	(Wales) WAL	Jason Koumas	47	13	42+2	12	0	0	2+1	1	0	0
9	FW	(Republic of Ireland) IRL	Alan Lee	29	2	6+19	2	0+1	0	3	0	0	0
9	FW	(Scotland) SCO	Steve Thompson	14	4	14	4	0	0	0	0	0	0
10	FW	(England) ENG	Cameron Jerome	47	20	44	18	1	1	2	1	0	0
11	MF	(Wales) WAL	Paul Parry	30	1	11+16	1	0	0	2+1	0	0	0
12	DF	(Wales) WAL	Rhys Weston	33	1	26+4	1	0	0	3	0	0	0
13	GK	(England) ENG	Tony Warner	0	0	0	0	0	0	0	0	0	0
14	MF	(Republic of Ireland) IRL	Willie Boland	16	0	11+4	0	0	0	1	0	0	0
15	DF	(Netherlands) NED	Glenn Loovens	36	2	32+1	2	1	0	2	0	0	0
16	MF	(Wales) WAL	Joe Ledley	45	4	42	3	1	0	2	1	0	0
17	MF	(England) ENG	Kevin Cooper	38	2	31+5	2	1	0	1	0	0	0
18	MF	(Northern Ireland) NIR	Phil Mulryne	5	0	1+3	0	0	0	0	0	1	0
19	MF	(Finland) FIN	Toni Koskela	1	0	0	0	0+1	0	0	0	0	0
19	MF	(England) ENG	Riccardo Scimeca	18	1	17+1	1	0	0	0	0	0	0
20	DF	(Wales) WAL	Byron Anthony	1	1	0	0	0	0	0	0	1	1
21	DF	(Wales) WAL	Daniel Parslow	1	0	0	0	0	0	0	0	1	0
22	FW	(Wales) WAL	Stuart Fleetwood	2	0	0	0	0	0	1	0	1	0
23	GK	(Wales) WAL	Martyn Margetson	2	0	0	0	0	0	2	0	0	0
24	MF	(Jamaica) JAM	Richard Langley	0	0	0	0	0	0	0	0	0	0
24	FW	(England) ENG	Michael Ricketts	17	5	17	5	0	0	0	0	0	0
24	FW	(Democratic Republic of the Congo) COD	Guylain Ndumbu-Nsungu	12	0	4+7	0	0	0	0	0	1	0
25	FW	(England) ENG	Andy Campbell	0	0	0	0	0	0	0	0	0	0
26	FW	(Italy) ITA	Andrea Ferretti	7	0	0+4	0	0	0	0+3	0	0	0
27	MF	(Wales) WAL	Nicky Fish	0	0	0	0	0	0	0	0	0	0
28	MF	(Wales) WAL	Jon Kift	0	0	0	0	0	0	0	0	0	0
29	MF	(Wales) WAL	Anthony Taylor	0	0	0	0	0	0	0	0	0	0
30	GK	(Wales) WAL	Lee Worgan	1	0	0	0	0	0	0	0	1	0
31	MF	(Wales) WAL	Darcy Blake	1	0	0+1	0	0	0	0	0	0	0
42	DF	(Wales) WAL	Joe Jacobson	2	0	0+1	0	0	0	0	0	1	0
49	MF	(Wales) WAL	Curtis McDonald	2	0	0+1	0	0	0	0	0	1	0

== Transfers ==
=== Summer transfers in ===
Player	Club	Fee
Kevin Cooper	Wolverhampton Wanderers	Undisclosed
Neil Cox	Watford	Free
Andrea Ferretti	Parma	Undisclosed
Philip Mulryne	Norwich City	Free
Darren Purse	West Bromwich Albion	Undisclosed
Jeff Whitley	Sunderland	Free
Lee Worgan	Unattached	Free

=== Summer transfers out ===
- * Indicates player joined club after being released by Cardiff

Player	Club	Fee
Lee Bullock	Hartlepool United	Free
James Collins	West Ham United	£3.5 m (combined)
Danny Gabbidon	West Ham United	£3.5 m (combined)
Gary Croft	Grimsby Town*	Free
Graham Kavanagh	Wigan Athletic	£400,000
Richard Langley	Queens Park Rangers	Free
Arran Lee-Barrett	Weymouth*	Free
Jobi McAnuff	Crystal Palace	£600,000
Rob Page	Coventry City	Free
John Robinson	Crawley Town*	Free
Danny Thomas	Carmarthen Town	Free
Peter Thorne	Norwich City	Free
Tony Vidmar	NAC Breda	Undisclosed
Darren Williams	Hartlepool United*	Free

=== Loans in ===
Player	Club	Arrival Date	Return Date
Glenn Loovens	Feyenoord	August 2005	End of Season
Jason Koumas	Wigan Athletic	August 2005	End of Season
Michael Ricketts	Leeds United	August 2005	January 2006

=== Loans out ===
Player	Club	Arrival Date	Return Date
Byron Anthony	Forest Green Rovers	February 2006	March 2006

=== January transfers in ===
Player	Club	Fee
Guylain Ndumbu-Nsungu	Darlington	Undisclosed
Riccardo Scimeca	West Bromwich Albion	Undisclosed
Steve Thompson	Rangers	£250,000

=== January transfers out ===
Player	Club	Fee
Stuart Fleetwood	Hereford United	Undisclosed
Tony Warner	Fulham	Free

== Standings ==
Pos	Team	Pld	W	D	L	GF	GA	GD	Pts
9	Norwich City	46	18	8	20	56	65	−9	62
10	Luton Town	46	17	10	19	66	67	−1	61
11	Cardiff City	46	16	12	18	58	59	−1	60
12	Southampton	46	13	19	14	49	50	−1	58
13	Stoke City	46	17	7	22	54	63	−9	58

Updated to match(es) played on 2 December 2011. Source: RSSSF
Rules for classification: 1) points; 2) goal difference; 3) number of goals scored.

=== Results by round ===
Round	1	2	3	4	5	6	7	8	9	10	11	12	13	14	15	16	17	18	19	20	21	22	23	24	25	26	27	28	29	30	31	32	33	34	35	36	37	38	39	40	41	42	43	44	45	46
Ground	A	H	H	A	H	A	H	H	A	A	H	A	H	H	A	A	H	A	A	H	H	A	A	H	H	A	H	A	H	A	H	A	H	A	H	A	H	A	A	H	A	H	H	A	H	A
Result	L	W	L	L	D	D	W	W	D	W	L	W	D	W	D	L	D	W	L	D	W	L	W	D	L	L	W	L	W	W	D	L	W	D	W	L	W	L	W	D	L	L	L	D	L	L
Position				21	19	21	15	12	14	9	11	9	8	7	9	9	11	5	10	8	6	10	5	7	10	11	8	10	8	7	7	7	7	7	7	8	7	8	8	8	8	8	8	8	9	11
Points	0	3	3	3	4	5	8	11	12	15	15	18	19	22	23	23	24	27	27	28	31	31	34	35	35	35	38	38	41	44	45	45	48	49	52	52	55	55	58	59	59	59	59	60	60	60

A = Away; H = Home; W = Win; D = Draw; L = Loss

== Fixtures and results ==
=== Championship ===
6 August 2005 1	Ipswich Town	1–0	Cardiff City	Ipswich
15:00	Nicky Forster 64'			Stadium: Portman Road; Attendance: 24,292; Referee: Kevin Friend (Leicestershire)

9 August 2005 2	Cardiff City	2–1	Leeds United	Cardiff
19:45	Jason Koumas 60'; Darren Purse 67' (pen.)		22' Robbie Blake	Stadium: Ninian Park; Attendance: 15,231; Referee: Steve Tanner (East Sussex)

12 August 2005 3	Cardiff City	1–3	Watford	Cardiff
19:45	Cameron Jerome 80'		7' Marlon King; 52' Darius Henderson; 67' Marlon King	Stadium: Ninian Park; Attendance: 9,256; Referee: Uriah Rennie (South Yorkshire)

20 August 2005 4	Derby County	2–1	Cardiff City	Derby
15:00	Morten Bisgaard 21'; Inigo Idiakez 45' (pen.)		83' Cameron Jerome	Stadium: Pride Park; Attendance: 23,153; Referee: Trevor Kettle (Berkshire)

27 August 2005 5	Cardiff City	2–2	Wolverhampton Wanderers	Cardiff
15:00	Cameron Jerome 3', 49'		73' Leon Clarke; 90' Joleon Lescott	Stadium: Ninian Park; Attendance: 11,502; Referee: Graham Salisbury (Lancashire)

10 September 2005 6	Burnley	3–3	Cardiff City	Burnley
15:00	Wade Elliott 1', 23'; James O'Connor 89'		8' Cameron Jerome; 45' Glenn Loovens; 72' (pen.) Darren Purse	Stadium: Turf Moor; Attendance: 10,431; Referee: Peter Walton (Northamptonshire)

13 September 2005 7	Cardiff City	1–0	Leicester City	Cardiff
19:45	Michael Ricketts 8'			Stadium: Ninian Park; Attendance: 9,196; Referee: Keith Stroud (Dorset)

17 September 2005 8	Cardiff City	1–0	Crystal Palace	Cardiff
15:00	Michael Ricketts 26'			Stadium: Ninian Park; Attendance: 11,647; Referee: Phil Dowd (Stoke-on-Trent)

24 September 2005 9	Millwall	0–0	Cardiff City	London
15:00				Stadium: The Den; Attendance: 9,254; Referee: Andy D'Urso (Billericay)

27 September 2005 10	Stoke City	0–3	Cardiff City	Stoke
			10', 43' Cameron Jerome; 12' Darren Purse	Stadium: Britannia Stadium; Attendance: 12,240; Referee: Richard Beeby (Northampton)

1 October 2005 11	Cardiff City	1–2	Luton Town	Cardiff
15:00	Michael Ricketts 9'	Luton report	30' Dean Morgan; 57' Peter Holmes	Stadium: Ninian Park; Attendance: 14,657; Referee: Mike Jones (Chester)

15 October 2005 12	Brighton & Hove Albion	1–2	Cardiff City	Brighton
15:00	Paul McShane 61'		12' Jason Koumas; 74' Alan Lee	Stadium: Withdean Stadium; Attendance: 6,485; Referee: Andy Woolmer (Northamptonshire)

18 October 2005 13	Cardiff City	2–2	Preston North End	Cardiff
19:45	Joe Ledley 31'; Jason Koumas 80'		62' Tyrone Mears; 90' Chris Sedgwick	Stadium: Ninian Park; Attendance: 9,574; Referee: Howard Webb (Yorkshire)

22 October 2005 14	Cardiff City	6–1	Crewe Alexandra	Cardiff
15:00	Michael Ricketts 18'; Joe Ledley 48'; Kevin Cooper 60'; Darren Purse 67' (pen.); Cameron Jerome 68'; Jason Koumas 74'		31' Steve Foster	Stadium: Ninian Park; Attendance: 10,815; Referee: Mike Russell (Hertfordshire)

29 October 2005 15	Sheffield United	0–0	Cardiff City	Sheffield
15:00				Stadium: Bramall Lane; Attendance: 25,311; Referee: Chris Foy (Lancashire)

1 November 2005 16	Norwich City	1–0	Cardiff City	Norwich
19:45	Neil Alexander 77' (o.g.)			Stadium: Carrow Road; Attendance: 23,838; Referee: Darren Drysdale (Lincolnshire)

6 November 2005 17	Cardiff City	0–0	Coventry City	Cardiff
15:00				Stadium: Ninian Park; Attendance: 11,424; Referee: Clive Penton (Sussex)

9 November 2005 18	Sheffield Wednesday	1–3	Cardiff City	Sheffield
19:45	Chris Eagles 65'		9' Jason Koumas; 30', 38' Cameron Jerome	Stadium: Hillsborough; Attendance: 20,324; Referee: Trevor Kettle (Berkshire)

19 November 2005 19	Preston North End	2–1	Cardiff City	Preston
15:00	Chris Sedgwick 22'; Patrick Agyemang 42'		68' Glenn Loovens	Stadium: Deepdale; Attendance: 13,904; Referee: Richard Beeby (Northampton)

22 November 2005 20	Cardiff City	1–1	Brighton & Hove Albion	Cardiff
19:45	Alan Lee 57'		76' Colin Kazim-Richards	Stadium: Ninian Park; Attendance: 9,595; Referee: Lee Mason (Bolton)

28 November 2005 21	Cardiff City	2–1	Ipswich Town	Cardiff
19:45	Michael Ricketts 30'; Jason Koumas 90'		86' Jimmy Juan	Stadium: Ninian Park; Attendance: 8,724; Referee: Andre Marriner (Birmingham)

3 December 2005 22	Hull City	2–0	Cardiff City	Hull
15:00	Billy Paynter 70'; Craig Fagan 88'			Stadium: KC Stadium; Attendance: 18,364; Referee: Paul Taylor (Middlesex)

10 December 2005 23	Leeds United	0–1	Cardiff City	Leeds
15:00			31' Jason Koumas	Stadium: Elland Road; Attendance: 20,597; Referee: Graham Salisbury (Lancashire)

17 December 2005 24	Cardiff City	0–0	Derby County	Cardiff
15:00				Stadium: Ninian Park; Attendance: 12,500; Referee: Phil Crossley (Kent)

26 December 2005 25	Cardiff City	0–2	Plymouth Argyle	Cardiff
13:00			71' (pen.) Paul Wotton; 79' David Norris	Stadium: Ninian Park; Attendance: 16,403; Referee: Lee Probert (Gloucestershire)

28 December 2005 26	Queens Park Rangers	1–0	Cardiff City	London
19:45	Marc Nygaard 47'			Stadium: Loftus Road; Attendance: 12,329; Referee: Mick Thorpe (Suffolk)

31 December 2005 27	Cardiff City	2–1	Southampton	Cardiff
13:00	Joe Ledley 6'; Cameron Jerome 9'		25' Dexter Blackstock	Stadium: Ninian Park; Attendance: 13,377; Referee: Chris Foy (Lancashire)

2 January 2006 28	Reading	5–1	Cardiff City	Reading
15:00	Steve Sidwell 11', 71'; Ibrahima Sonko 32'; Dave Kitson 51', 76' (pen.)		62' Cameron Jerome	Stadium: Madejski Stadium; Attendance: 22,668; Referee: Ray Olivier (Sutton Coldfield)

14 January 2006 29	Cardiff City	3–0	Burnley	Cardiff
15:00	Steve Thompson 58', 60'; Jason Koumas 63'			Stadium: Ninian Park; Attendance: 10,872; Referee: Darren Drysdale (Lincolnshire)

21 January 2006 30	Leicester City	1–2	Cardiff City	Leicester
15:00	Matt Fryatt 41'		13' Cameron Jerome; 56' Jason Koumas	Stadium: Walkers Stadium; Attendance: 20,140; Referee: Neil Swarbrick (Lancashire)

31 January 2006 31	Cardiff City	1–1	Millwall	Cardiff
19:45	Cameron Jerome 28'		60' Berry Powel	Stadium: Ninian Park; Attendance: 12,738; Referee: Andre Marriner (Birmingham)

4 February 2006 32	Crystal Palace	1–0	Cardiff City	London
15:00	Aki Riihilahti 70'			Stadium: Selhurst Park; Attendance: 17,962; Referee: Anthony Bates (Stoke-on-Trent)

11 February 2006 33	Cardiff City	3–0	Stoke City	Cardiff
15:00	Kevin Cooper 18'; Neil Cox 30', 68'			Stadium: Ninian Park; Attendance: 10,780; Referee: Mike Jones (Chester)

14 February 2006 34	Luton Town	3–3	Cardiff City	Luton
19:45	Rowan Vine 25', 26'; Chris Barker 60' (o.g.)	Luton report	55', 86' Jason Koumas; 71' Riccardo Scimeca	Stadium: Kenilworth Road; Attendance: 7,826; Referee: Andy Woolmer (Northamptonshire)

18 February 2006 35	Cardiff City	1–0	Hull City	Cardiff
15:00	Cameron Jerome 22'			Stadium: Ninian Park; Attendance: 11,047; Referee: Brian Curson (Leicestershire)

25 February 2006 36	Watford	2–1	Cardiff City	Watford
15:00	Malky Mackay 69'; Marlon King 77'		77' Jeff Whitley	Stadium: Vicarage Road; Attendance: 17,419; Referee: Clive Penton (Sussex)

4 March 2006 37	Cardiff City	1–0	Sheffield Wednesday	Cardiff
15:00	Cameron Jerome 19'			Stadium: Ninian Park; Attendance: 11,851; Referee: Lee Probert (Gloucestershire)

11 March 2006 38	Wolverhampton Wanderers	2–0	Cardiff City	Wolverhampton
15:00	Denes Rosa 15'; Kenny Miller 54' (pen.)			Stadium: Molineux; Attendance: 23,996; Referee: Graham Salisbury (Lancashire)

18 March 2006 39	Plymouth Argyle	0–1	Cardiff City	Plymouth
15:00			34' Steve Thompson	Stadium: Home Park; Attendance: 13,494; Referee: Ray Olivier (Sutton Coldfield)

25 March 2006 40	Cardiff City	0–0	Queens Park Rangers	Cardiff
15:00				Stadium: Ninian Park; Attendance: 14,271; Referee: Kevin Wright (Cambridgeshire)

1 April 2006 41	Southampton	3–2	Cardiff City	Southampton
15:00	Claus Lundekvam 47'; Ricardo Fuller 70', 75'		54' Cameron Jerome; 90' Darren Purse	Stadium: St Mary's Stadium; Attendance: 22,388; Referee: Peter Walton (Northamptonshire)

8 April 2006 42	Cardiff City	2–5	Reading	Cardiff
15:00	Cameron Jerome 67'; Paul Parry 80'		10', 90' James Harper; 39' Dave Kitson; 52' (o.g.) Glenn Loovens; 87' Kevin Doyle	Stadium: Ninian Park; Attendance: 11,866; Referee: Tony Leake (Hertfordshire)

14 April 2006 43	Cardiff City	0–1	Sheffield United	Cardiff
15:00			76' Danny Webber	Stadium: Ninian Park; Attendance: 11,006; Referee: Mike Jones (Chester)

17 April 2006 44	Crewe Alexandra	1–1	Cardiff City	Crewe
15:00	David Vaughan 58'		76' Jason Koumas	Stadium: Gresty Road; Attendance: 5,865; Referee: Jon Moss (Yorkshire)

22 April 2006 45	Cardiff City	0–1	Norwich City	Cardiff
15:00			16' Robert Earnshaw	Stadium: Ninian Park; Attendance: 11,590; Referee: Andre Marriner (Birmingham)

30 April 2006 46	Coventry City	3–1	Cardiff City	Coventry
13:30	Stern John 8'; Dele Adebola 65'; Dennis Wise 90'		21' Steve Thompson	Stadium: Ricoh Arena; Attendance: 22,536; Referee: Trevor Kettle (Berkshire)

=== League Cup ===
24 August 2005 Round 1	Colchester United	0–2	Cardiff City	Colchester
19:45			31' (pen.) Darren Purse; 34' Cameron Jerome	Stadium: Layer Road; Attendance: 1,904; Referee: Richard Beeby (Northampton)

20 September 2005 Round 2	Cardiff City	2–1	Macclesfield Town	Cardiff
19:45	Joe Ledley 50'; Jason Koumas 81'		5' Martin Bullock	Stadium: Ninian Park; Attendance: 3,849; Referee: Paul Melin (Surrey)

26 October 2005 Round 3	Cardiff City	0–1	Leicester City	Cardiff
19:45			11' Nils-Eric Johansson	Stadium: Ninian Park; Attendance: 8,727; Referee: Iain Williamson (Berkshire)

=== FA Cup ===
7 January 2006 Round 3	Arsenal	2–1	Cardiff City	London
13:00	Robert Pires 6', 18'		87' Cameron Jerome	Stadium: Highbury; Attendance: 36,552; Referee: Martin Atkinson (West Yorkshire)

=== FAW Premier Cup ===
10 January 2006 Quarter Final	Carmarthen Town	2–1	Cardiff City	Carmarthen
20:00	Danny Thomas 23'; Nathan Cotterall 39'		5' Byron Anthony	Stadium: Richmond Park, Carmarthen; Attendance: 952; Referee: Brian Lawlor (Anglesey)

== See also ==
- List of Cardiff City F.C. seasons
- 2005–06 in English football
