= Cameron Jerome =

English footballer (born 1986)

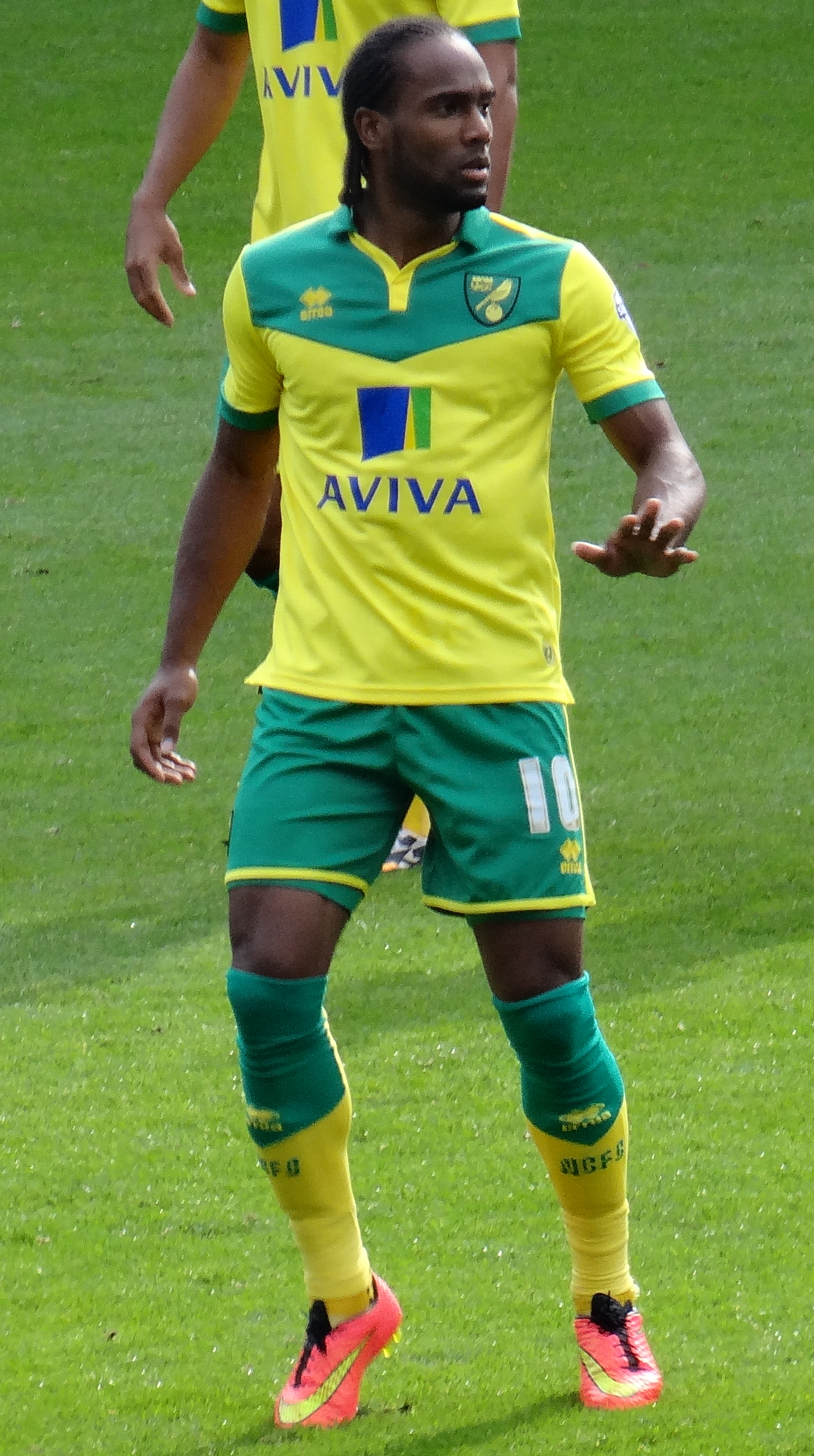
- Jerome playing for Norwich City in 2014

Personal information
- Full name: Cameron Zishan Rana-Jerome
- Date of birth: 14 August 1986 (age 40)
- Place of birth: Huddersfield, England
- Height: 6 ft 1 in (1.85 m)
- Position: Striker

Youth career
- Huddersfield Town
- Grimsby Town
- Sheffield Wednesday

Senior career*
| Years | Team | Apps | (Gls) |
| 2003–2004 | Middlesbrough | 0 | (0) |
| 2004–2006 | Cardiff City | 73 | (24) |
| 2006–2011 | Birmingham City (Note: Soccerbase's stats for the match between Derby County and Birmingham City on 9 March 2007 fail to include appearances by substitutes for either side, one of whom was Jerome. Additionally, the Dubious Goals Panel awarded Jerome a goal against Burnley on 1 May 2010, originally given as a Brian Jensen own goal, bringing his total of League goals for the 2009–10 season to 11. Until and unless they correct the figures, he should have one more League appearance and one more League goal for Birmingham than given on his Soccerbase page, i.e. his League totals for his career at Birmingham should be 181 appearances and 37 goals.) | 181 | (37) |
| 2011–2014 | Stoke City | 50 | (7) |
| 2013–2014 | → Crystal Palace (loan) | 28 | (2) |
| 2014–2018 | Norwich City | 130 | (38) |
| 2018 | Derby County | 18 | (5) |
| 2018–2020 | Göztepe | 50 | (8) |
| 2020–2021 | Milton Keynes Dons | 34 | (13) |
| 2021–2023 | Luton Town | 52 | (4) |
| 2023–2024 | Bolton Wanderers | 40 | (3) |
| Total | | 656 | (141) |

International career
| 2005–2008 | England U21 | 10 | (0) |
- * Club domestic league appearances and goals

Cameron Zishan Rana-Jerome (born 14 August 1986), is an English former professional footballer who played as a striker.

Jerome began his career as a trainee with Huddersfield Town, Grimsby Town, Sheffield Wednesday and Middlesbrough before signing a professional contract with Cardiff City in the summer of 2004. He quickly became a regular at Ninian Park and after scoring 20 goals in the 2005–06 season he was signed by Birmingham City for a fee of £3 million. He spent five years at St Andrew's where he experienced two promotions and two relegations and also helped the side win the 2011 Football League Cup.

Jerome joined Stoke City in August 2011 for a fee of around £4 million and was mainly used as an impact player by Tony Pulis. After not figuring in new manager Mark Hughes' plans Jerome joined Crystal Palace on loan for the 2013–14 season. Jerome joined Norwich City in August 2014, and after 138 appearances in three and a half years, he signed for Derby County in January 2018. After a spell at Turkish club Göztepe, he joined Milton Keynes Dons in October 2020 on a free transfer and spent 18 months with Luton Town before signing for Bolton Wanderers in January 2023, spending another 18 months there and winning the EFL Trophy before retiring.

== Club career ==
=== Early career ===
Jerome was born in Huddersfield, West Yorkshire, and is of Grenadian descent. As a youth, Jerome played for Stile Common, alongside Anthony Griffith, Fraizer Campbell, and Reuben Noble-Lazarus, who all went on to enjoy careers as professional players. Griffith and Jerome also played for Yorkshire Counties. Jerome later joined home town club Westend Juniors before moving on to Huddersfield Town as a junior, then moved on via Grimsby Town, Sheffield Wednesday and Middlesbrough to gain a contract at Cardiff City, after being recommended by reserve team manager Paul Wilkinson. Jerome played under Wilkinson in Grimsby's youth system, but after Wilkinson left Blundell Park to take up his position with Cardiff in October 2003, Jerome was released by replacement Neil Woods.

=== Cardiff City ===
Described by the BBC as "one of Cardiff's rising stars", Jerome made his debut in a 0–0 draw with Leeds United on 2 October 2004, as a substitute for Andy Campbell. He scored his first professional goal in his second senior appearance in League Cup tie against Bournemouth, before going on to score seven goals in 32 appearances in the 2004–05 season, and was in a good run of form in the 2005–06 season, finishing top scorer for Cardiff with 20 goals.

His hot form earned him a contract with second-city club Birmingham City. The move not only benefitted Jerome but also helped Cardiff as they used the transfer money to sign Michael Chopra, Stephen McPhail and Glenn Loovens.

=== Birmingham City ===
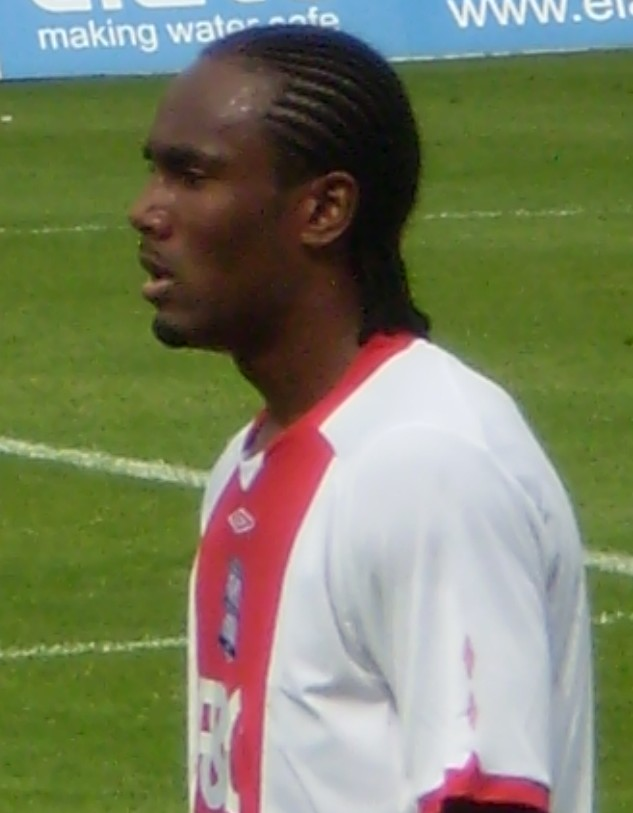
Jerome playing for Birmingham City in 2008

Jerome signed for Birmingham City on 31 May 2006, for a transfer fee reported as an initial £3 million, potentially rising to £4m. Jerome made his debut as a 66th-minute substitute against Colchester United at St Andrew's on 5 August. However, it was a debut to forget, as he was sent off within five minutes of entering play for elbowing an opponent in the face. He netted his first goal for Birmingham against Queens Park Rangers at Loftus Road on 12 September.

Jerome scored his first Premier League goal after 32 seconds of the away match against Derby County on 25 August 2007; his second goal of that game confirmed Birmingham's first win of the 2007–08 season. He finished the season as Birmingham's second top goal scorer with 7 goals in 33 games as Birmingham were relegated. However, the Blues immediately bounced back in the 2008–09 season by finishing second in the Championship. Jerome's 10 goals in 45 appearances were only bettered by veteran partner Kevin Phillips in the Birmingham attack. He scored the first goal in the West Midlands derby match against Wolverhampton Wanderers as Birmingham won 2–0.

In July 2009, Jerome signed a new five-year contract with the club. He scored a spectacular first goal of the 2009–10 season to give his club a 2–1 lead against Liverpool, described as "the kind of goal that only the likes of Gerrard usually scores at Anfield"; he "fended off the irritation of Mascherano and unleashed a thunderous shot which dipped over keeper Reina." Jerome hit a purple patch as the Blues notched up a club-record fifteen consecutive games unbeaten in the Premier League, scoring crucial goals against Stoke City, Manchester United and two versus Blackburn Rovers. His tenth goal of the season, a header from James McFadden's cross, came in a 5–1 defeat away to Manchester City. Two weeks after the final game of the season, Jerome's goals total rose to 11 when he was awarded an extra goal by the Dubious Goals Committee for his attempt against Burnley, which had originally been given as an own goal by Brian Jensen.

Jerome was a 92nd-minute substitute as Birmingham won the 2011 League Cup, defeating favourites Arsenal 2–1 at Wembley Stadium.

=== Stoke City ===
On 31 August 2011, the last day of the transfer window, Jerome signed a four-year contract with Premier League club Stoke City for an undisclosed fee, believed by Sky Sports to be £4 million. He scored on his Stoke City debut in the UEFA Europa League against Dynamo Kyiv to earn his side a 1–1 draw away from home. He scored against Maccabi Tel Aviv in a 3–0 win but was then sent off for two bookable offences. Jerome scored his first League goal for Stoke against Wigan Athletic on 31 December 2011; it was his first league goal for more than 13 months. He was used in a squad rotation system by manager Tony Pulis, something which he admitted he would have to accept. He continued to make an impact as a substitute, scoring against West Bromwich Albion and Everton. However, he began to vent his frustration at his lack of starts.

The 2012–13 season began with Jerome again on the bench and almost joining Blackburn Rovers on loan. In a rare appearance, against Newcastle United on 28 November 2012 coming on as a substitute, he provided an assist for Jonathan Walters and then scored the winning goal. On 29 December, Jerome "lashed into the top corner from 30 yards" to score Stoke's third goal in a 3–3 draw with Southampton in the final minute of the match. He scored his third and final goal of the season in a 2–1 win against Reading on 9 February 2013. Stoke ended the season in 13th position with Jerome making 30 appearances of which nine were starts. At the end of the season Tony Pulis was replaced by Mark Hughes and Jerome criticised Pulis' lack of squad rotation. – "There's no guarantees [for places under Hughes] but before in the old regime, there was a guaranteed XI who played. No matter what happened, how you trained or if you came on and did well in the games you were involved in, you were still never going to start."

On 5 August 2013, Jerome admitted an FA charge of breaching betting regulations. He was fined £50,000 and was also severely warned as to his future conduct by the FA.

=== Loan to Crystal Palace ===
On 2 September 2013, Jerome joined Crystal Palace on loan for the 2013–14 season. He made his debut for the club on 14 September, coming on as a 64th-minute substitute for Dwight Gayle in a 2–0 defeat away at Manchester United. After a poor start to the season Ian Holloway left Palace by mutual consent and Tony Pulis was appointed manager on 23 November. Despite Jerome criticising Pulis towards the end of his time at Stoke, he started and scored against his former club Cardiff City on 7 December. In total Jerome played 29 times for the Eagles scoring twice as they finished in 11th position.

=== Norwich City ===
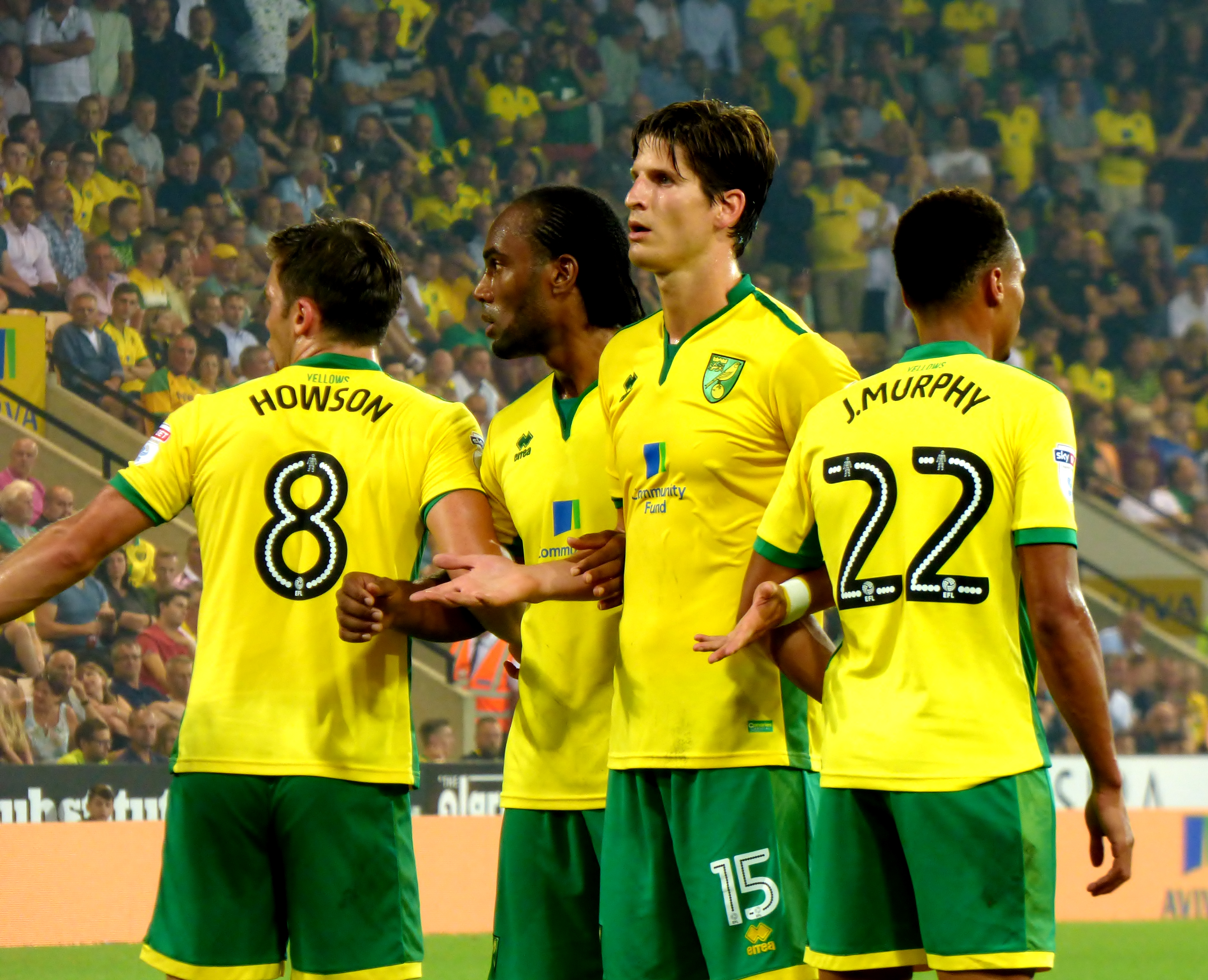
Jerome (second from left) lining up a wall with Norwich City for a free kick in 2016

On 20 August 2014, Jerome joined Championship club Norwich City for an undisclosed fee believed to be around £1.5 million. He scored his first goal for the club on 13 September in a 4–2 away victory over Cardiff City. His goal was the fourth of Norwich's second-half goals, in a game which they came from 2–0 behind to win. Jerome scored twice in a 3–0 win three days later away at Brentford. He scored another two on 20 September against former club Birmingham City, taking his tally to five goals in four league matches. He scored his sixth goal on 4 October in a draw with Rotherham United that kept Norwich top of the table. He added another two on 31 October as Norwich beat Bolton 2–1.

After an impressive first season at Norwich, Jerome was voted third in the club's annual Player of the Season competition. Norwich finished third, just short of automatic promotion, and qualified for the playoffs. They reached the final against Middlesbrough, and Jerome scored the opening goal in a 2–0 victory for the Canaries. Jerome had an effective game, frustrating Middlesbrough with his frequent pressing, and was named man of the match.

On 6 August 2016, Jerome scored in the 4–1 win away to Blackburn Rovers on the opening day of the 2016–17 season. On 21 August, he scored Norwich's only goal in the East Anglian derby, which ended in a 1–1 draw at Portman Road. Jerome scored his 16th and last goal of the season in the 7–1 thrashing of Reading on 8 April 2017.

=== Derby County ===
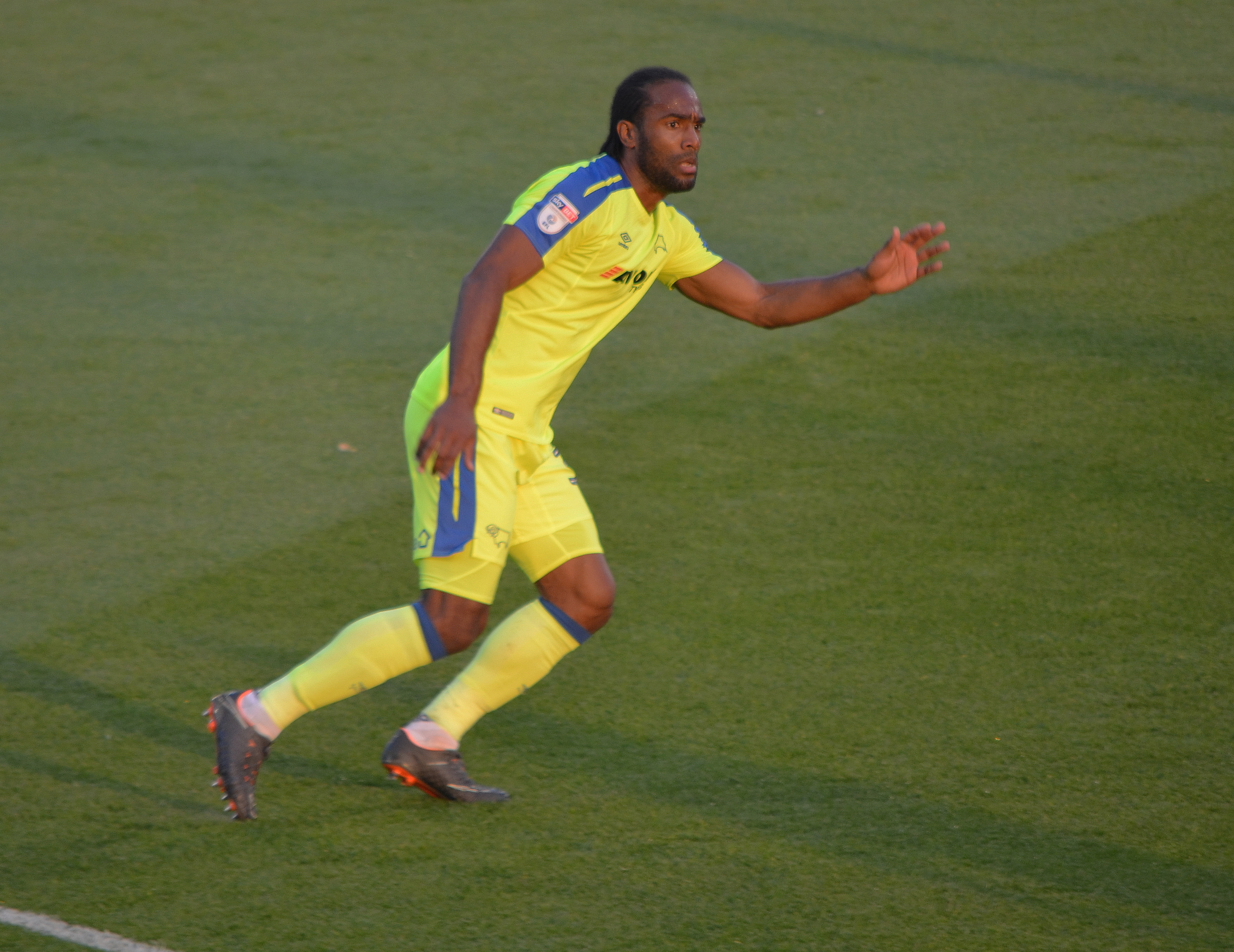
Jerome playing for Derby County in 2018

On 16 January 2018, Jerome joined Derby County on a one-and-a-half-year contract. The fee, officially undisclosed, was reported by Sky Sports as £1.5 million. He scored his first goal for Derby in a 3–0 home win against Brentford on 3 February, and finished the season with 6 from 20 appearances, including a goal in the play-off semi-final, as Derby failed to gain promotion.

=== Göztepe ===
On 31 August 2018, Jerome joined Turkish Süper Lig club Göztepe for an undisclosed fee. His first goal for the club opened the scoring in a 3–2 home win against Konyaspor on 30 September.

=== Milton Keynes Dons ===
On 9 October 2020, Jerome returned to England following his release from Göztepe. Milton Keynes Dons manager Russell Martin moved to bring his former teammate to the club on a free transfer of an undisclosed length. Jerome made his league debut for the club the following day in a 2–1 defeat to Portsmouth, and scored his first goal for the club a week later in a 2–0 home win over Gillingham.

=== Luton Town ===
In June 2021, Championship club Luton Town confirmed Jerome would join them when his contract with MK Dons expired.

=== Bolton Wanderers ===
Having found travelling from his home in the north-west of England increasingly problematic, Jerome left Luton Town on 27 January 2023 after his contract was cancelled by mutual consent. The same day, he signed for League One club Bolton Wanderers on an eighteen-month contract. On 2 April, he came on as a substitute in the 2023 EFL Trophy Final against Plymouth Argyle. Bolton went on to win 4–0. Jerome scored his first goal for Bolton on 10 January 2024 in a 3–1 win against Accrington Stanley in the EFL Trophy round of 16. On 22 May, the club confirmed that he would be leaving at the end of his contract on 30 June.

=== Retirement ===
Jerome appeared in a friendly for Stockport County played in Spain against Derby County in July 2024.

In December 2024, it was announced that he had retired from the playing side of the game.

== International career ==
Jerome made 10 appearances for England U21 between 2005 and 2008 without scoring.

In October 2022, Jerome agreed to represent Grenada.

== Personal life ==
Jerome's younger brother, Sam, played football for Leeds United's youth teams until May 2009. Another younger brother, Ruben, is also a footballer. Jerome grew up supporting Manchester United.

== Career statistics ==
As of match played 18 May 2024

Appearances and goals by club, season and competition
| Club | Season | League | | | National cup | | League cup | | Other | | Total | |
| Club | Season | Division | Apps | Goals | Apps | Goals | Apps | Goals | Apps | Goals | Apps | Goals |
|---|---|---|---|---|---|---|---|---|---|---|---|---|
| Cardiff City | 2004–05 | Championship | 29 | 6 | 1 | 0 | 2 | 1 | — | | 32 | 7 |
| Cardiff City | 2005–06 | Championship | 44 | 18 | 1 | 1 | 2 | 1 | — | | 47 | 20 |
| Cardiff City | Total | | 73 | 24 | 2 | 1 | 4 | 2 | — | | 79 | 27 |
| Birmingham City | 2006–07 | Championship | 38 | 7 | 2 | 0 | 4 | 2 | — | | 44 | 9 |
| Birmingham City | 2007–08 | Premier League | 33 | 7 | 1 | 0 | 0 | 0 | — | | 34 | 7 |
| Birmingham City | 2008–09 | Championship | 43 | 9 | 1 | 0 | 1 | 1 | — | | 45 | 10 |
| Birmingham City | 2009–10 | Premier League | 32 | 11 | 4 | 0 | 0 | 0 | — | | 36 | 11 |
| Birmingham City | 2010–11 | Premier League | 34 | 3 | 4 | 2 | 4 | 0 | — | | 42 | 5 |
| Birmingham City | 2011–12 | Championship | 1 | 0 | — | | — | | 0 | 0 | 1 | 0 |
| Birmingham City | Total | | 181 | 37 | 12 | 2 | 9 | 3 | 0 | 0 | 202 | 42 |
| Stoke City | 2011–12 | Premier League | 23 | 4 | 4 | 2 | 2 | 0 | 7 (Note: Appearances in UEFA Europa League) | 2 | 36 | 8 |
| Stoke City | 2012–13 | Premier League | 26 | 3 | 3 | 1 | 1 | 0 | — | | 30 | 4 |
| Stoke City | 2013–14 | Premier League | 1 | 0 | — | | 0 | 0 | — | | 1 | 0 |
| Stoke City | Total | | 50 | 7 | 7 | 3 | 3 | 0 | 7 | 2 | 67 | 12 |
| Crystal Palace (loan) | 2013–14 | Premier League | 28 | 2 | 1 | 0 | — | | — | | 29 | 2 |
| Norwich City | 2014–15 | Championship | 41 | 18 | 0 | 0 | 1 | 1 | 3 (Note: Appearances in Championship play-offs) | 2 | 45 | 21 |
| Norwich City | 2015–16 | Premier League | 34 | 3 | 1 | 0 | 0 | 0 | — | | 35 | 3 |
| Norwich City | 2016–17 | Championship | 40 | 16 | 1 | 0 | 0 | 0 | — | | 41 | 16 |
| Norwich City | 2017–18 | Championship | 15 | 1 | 0 | 0 | 2 | 1 | — | | 17 | 2 |
| Norwich City | Total | | 130 | 38 | 2 | 0 | 3 | 2 | 3 | 2 | 138 | 42 |
| Derby County | 2017–18 | Championship | 18 | 5 | — | | — | | 2 | 1 | 20 | 6 |
| Derby County | 2018–19 | Championship | 0 | 0 | — | | 0 | 0 | — | | 0 | 0 |
| Derby County | Total | | 18 | 5 | — | | 0 | 0 | 2 | 1 | 20 | 6 |
| Göztepe | 2018–19 | Süper Lig | 28 | 5 | 2 | 0 | — | | — | | 30 | 5 |
| Göztepe | 2019–20 | Süper Lig | 22 | 3 | 2 | 0 | — | | — | | 24 | 3 |
| Göztepe | Total | | 50 | 8 | 4 | 0 | — | | — | | 54 | 8 |
| Milton Keynes Dons | 2020–21 | League One | 34 | 13 | 2 | 2 | — | | 2 (Note: Appearance(s) in EFL Trophy) | 0 | 38 | 15 |
| Luton Town | 2021–22 | Championship | 31 | 3 | 3 | 1 | 1 | 1 | 2 | 0 | 37 | 5 |
| Luton Town | 2022–23 | Championship | 21 | 1 | 2 | 0 | 1 | 0 | — | | 24 | 1 |
| Luton Town | Total | | 52 | 4 | 5 | 1 | 2 | 1 | 2 | 0 | 61 | 6 |
| Bolton Wanderers | 2022–23 | League One | 10 | 0 | — | | — | | 2 (Note: One appearance in EFL Trophy, one in League One play-offs) | 0 | 12 | 0 |
| Bolton Wanderers | 2023–24 | League One | 30 | 3 | 3 | 0 | 1 | 0 | 9 (Note: Six appearances in EFL Trophy, three in League One play-offs) | 1 | 43 | 4 |
| Bolton Wanderers | Total | | 40 | 3 | 3 | 0 | 1 | 0 | 11 | 1 | 55 | 4 |
| Career total | | | 656 | 141 | 38 | 9 | 22 | 8 | 27 | 6 | 743 | 164 |

== Honours ==
Birmingham City

- Football League Championship runner-up: 2006–07, 2008–09
- Football League Cup: 2010–11

Norwich City

- Football League Championship play-offs: 2015

Bolton Wanderers

- EFL Trophy: 2022–23
