= Paul Parry =

Welsh footballer (born 1980)

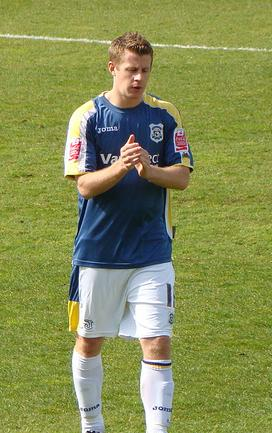

Personal information
- Full name: Paul Ian Parry
- Date of birth: 19 August 1980 (age 46)
- Place of birth: Chepstow, Wales
- Position: Winger

Team information
- Current team: Chepstow Town

Youth career
- 1995–1997: Bristol City
- 1997–1998: Hereford United

Senior career*
| Years | Team | Apps | (Gls) |
| 1998–2004 | Hereford United | 150 | (29) |
| 2004–2009 | Cardiff City | 191 | (24) |
| 2009–2012 | Preston North End | 80 | (6) |
| 2012–2014 | Shrewsbury Town | 70 | (11) |
| 2022 | Risca United | | |
| Total | | 491 | (70) |

International career
| 2004–2008 | Wales | 12 | (1) |
- * Club domestic league appearances and goals

Paul Ian Parry (born 19 August 1980) is a Welsh former footballer who is the assistant manager alongside Marc Ingles in the Ardal South East side Chepstow Town. He is a former Wales international, and played for Hereford United, Cardiff City, Preston North End and Shrewsbury Town during a 16-year professional career.

== Personal life ==
Parry was born in Chepstow. As a youngster he attended Chepstow Comprehensive School.

Parry suffers from a severe fear of flying (aviophobia) which, like other footballers such as Dennis Bergkamp, has caused problems during his career due to his inability to sometimes travel with the Wales team to far-away countries. He manages to overcome by taking tablets. It has also caused problems in his club career when his teams have travelled to opposite ends of Great Britain. He has often managed to get around the problem by travelling the long distances by car.

He currently runs a property management company called Parry Property LTD, with his wife, Samantha.

== Club career ==
=== Hereford United ===
Parry started his career at Bristol City where he spent two years as a schoolboy, before joining Hereford United as a YTS trainee. He made his league debut for Hereford on 7 November 1998, coming on as a substitute in a 3–2 defeat away to Leek Town. His profile was raised after an excellent FA Cup performance against Leicester City in the 1999/00 season. In this match, Parry so nearly scored the winning goal when he dribbled half the length of the pitch and hit the post when one-on-one with goalkeeper Tim Flowers.

He was Hereford's leading goalscorer in the 2002–03 season. On 19 December 2003, under the watchful eye of Cardiff City manager Lennie Lawrence, Parry scored a hat-trick for Hereford in a 7–1 rout over Forest Green. Soon after, Cardiff signed him for an initial fee of £75,000, which would increase depending on appearances. Parry's final appearance for Hereford saw him score the winning goal in added time against Stevenage Borough.

=== Cardiff City ===
He quickly became a firm favourite with the Bluebirds fans under manager Lennie Lawrence. During this time Parry came close to leaving after the club revealed that it had large financial problems. He was linked with a move to Yeovil Town, who had tracked Parry from his days at Hereford United, but he eventually managed to avoid the cull of players, which included club captain Graham Kavanagh and star players Jobi McAnuff and Peter Thorne. He had continued to improve under new manager Dave Jones where, at the time of Parry's departure, was the longest serving first team player at the club and was a huge favourite with the Bluebirds fans.

==== 2007–08 ====
Parry began the 2007/08 season in fine form, forcing summer signing Trevor Sinclair out of the team with his impressive displays. His continuing good form also found him finding the net more often for Cardiff with goals against Queens Park Rangers, Burnley, Ipswich Town and Sheffield United leaving him as the Bluebirds joint top scorer by late December. His good form in the season and Cardiff's financial trouble saw several other Championship sides enquire about him, Norwich City even having a £750,000 offer rejected, but Parry stated that he did not wish to leave Cardiff. January saw Parry return to the club he started his playing career at, Hereford United, when the two sides met in the fourth round of the FA Cup, with Cardiff winning 2–1.

Towards the end of the season, with a lack of strikers at the club, Parry was used primarily as a striker, playing alongside either Jimmy Floyd Hasselbaink and Steve Thompson, and he would go on to finish the season as the club's joint top scorer, along with Joe Ledley, with 11 goals in all competitions. In April he suffered a hamstring injury during a 0–0 draw against West Bromwich Albion and he was forced to miss the remaining league games of the season as well as the FA Cup semi-final win over Barnsley. The injury meant he was forced into a long wait over his chances of appearing in the final, but he did eventually manage to return in time and played all 90 minutes in a 1–0 defeat to Portsmouth.

==== 2008–09 ====
After stating his intent to be a regular as a forward for the club, Parry opened his goalscoring account early in the 2008–09 season, scoring both goals in a 2–1 win over AFC Bournemouth in the first round of the League Cup, the team's second game of the season on 12 August. However Parry soon reverted to playing as a winger due to the partnership of Ross McCormack and Jay Bothroyd and was forced to wait until 4 October before scoring his first league goal of the season in a 1–1 draw with Blackpool. In February 2009, Parry made his 200th appearance in all competitions for Cardiff when he played in a 4–0 defeat to Arsenal in the fourth round of the FA Cup.

=== Preston North End ===
On 3 August 2009, Parry joined Championship rivals Preston North End for a fee of around £300,000. He made his debut against Bristol City in a 2–2 draw at Deepdale and scored his first goal for the Lilywhites in his fourth appearance during a 3–0 victory over Barnsley on 18 August. After being a reserve for most of the 2010/11 season, Parry regained his first team place, at the start of the new campaign in League 1, in PNE team at left-back putting in some brilliant performances.

=== Shrewsbury Town ===
On 9 July 2012, Parry signed for League One club Shrewsbury Town having turned down a new offer from Preston North End. He made his debut for the club in the League Cup, in a 4–0 defeat against Yorkshire side Leeds United at Elland Road. Parry scored his first goal for the club on 14 August 2012, in a 1–0 win at home against Preston North End. Parry finished the 2012–2013 season with 6 goals in 34 appearances. Following Shrewsbury's relegation the following season, Parry was released at the end of his contract.

=== Risca United ===
In January 2022, he came out of retirement to sign for Cymru South side Risca United.

== International career ==
Parry made his international debut for Wales on 18 February 2004, coming on as a substitute in the 4–0 win over Scotland. It capped a remarkable rise for the midfielder who, at the time, had only made five appearances since joining Cardiff and had been playing Conference football six weeks earlier. He scored his first international goal in the 1–0 win over Canada on 30 May 2004.

In August 2007, Parry was called up to the Wales squad for the Euro 2008 qualifiers against Germany and Slovakia but pulled out of the squad for personal reasons, which were later revealed to be due to going through a stressful divorce and custody battle. His decision was branded "silly" by former Cardiff player Jason Perry. However, on 15 January 2008 Parry stated that he would return to play for Wales if he was called upon by Toshack. Parry returned to international football to win one more cap in a friendly match against Georgia before causing another shock by announcing his retirement from internationals at the age of 28, later stating that he felt like a "spare part" in the Wales team after being overlooked during a 2010 World Cup qualifying match against Azerbaijan.

During his time at Hereford Parry also played for the Wales semi-professional team.

=== International goals ===
| # | Date | Venue | Opponent | Score | Result | Competition |
|---|---|---|---|---|---|---|
| 1 | 30 May 2004 | Racecourse Ground, Wrexham, Wales | Canada | 1–0 | 1–0 | Friendly |

== Career statistics ==
=== Club ===
Appearances and goals by club, season and competition
| Club | Season | League | | | FA Cup | | League Cup | | Other | | Total | |
| Club | Season | Division | Apps | Goals | Apps | Goals | Apps | Goals | Apps | Goals | Apps | Goals |
|---|---|---|---|---|---|---|---|---|---|---|---|---|
| Hereford United | 1998–99 | Football Conference | 1 | 0 | 0 | 0 | — | | 0 | 0 | 1 | 0 |
| Hereford United | 1999–2000 | Football Conference | 30 | 4 | 4 | 0 | — | | 1 (Note: Appearance in Conference Challenge Trophy) | 0 | 35 | 4 |
| Hereford United | 2000–01 | Football Conference | 18 | 1 | 0 | 0 | — | | 3 (Note: One appearance in Conference Challenge Trophy; two appearances in FA Trophy) | 0 | 21 | 1 |
| Hereford United | 2001–02 | Football Conference | 39 | 5 | 2 | 0 | — | | 0 | 0 | 41 | 5 |
| Hereford United | 2002–03 | Football Conference | 37 | 10 | 1 | 0 | — | | 1 (Note: Appearance(s) in Football League Trophy) | 1 | 39 | 11 |
| Hereford United | 2003–04 | Football Conference | 25 | 9 | 1 | 0 | — | | 1 | 0 | 27 | 9 |
| Hereford United | Total | | 150 | 29 | 8 | 0 | — | | 6 | 1 | 164 | 30 |
| Cardiff City | 2003–04 | First Division | 17 | 1 | — | | — | | 0 | 0 | 17 | 1 |
| Cardiff City | 2004–05 | Championship | 24 | 4 | 0 | 0 | 4 | 0 | 0 | 0 | 28 | 4 |
| Cardiff City | 2005–06 | Championship | 27 | 1 | 0 | 0 | 3 | 0 | 0 | 0 | 30 | 1 |
| Cardiff City | 2006–07 | Championship | 42 | 6 | 0 | 0 | 1 | 0 | 0 | 0 | 43 | 6 |
| Cardiff City | 2007–08 | Championship | 41 | 10 | 5 | 1 | 4 | 0 | 0 | 0 | 50 | 11 |
| Cardiff City | 2008–09 | Championship | 40 | 2 | 3 | 0 | 3 | 2 | — | | 46 | 4 |
| Cardiff City | Total | | 191 | 24 | 8 | 1 | 15 | 2 | 0 | 0 | 214 | 27 |
| Preston North End | 2009–10 | Championship | 17 | 2 | 0 | 0 | 2 | 0 | — | | 19 | 2 |
| Preston North End | 2010–11 | Championship | 23 | 0 | 0 | 0 | 2 | 0 | — | | 25 | 0 |
| Preston North End | 2011–12 | League One | 40 | 4 | 2 | 0 | 2 | 0 | 3 | 0 | 47 | 4 |
| Preston North End | Total | | 80 | 6 | 2 | 0 | 6 | 0 | 3 | 0 | 91 | 6 |
| Shrewsbury Town | 2012–13 | League One | 31 | 6 | 1 | 0 | 1 | 0 | 1 | 0 | 34 | 6 |
| Shrewsbury Town | 2013–14 | League One | 39 | 5 | 1 | 0 | 1 | 0 | 1 | 0 | 42 | 5 |
| Shrewsbury Town | Total | | 70 | 11 | 2 | 0 | 2 | 0 | 2 | 0 | 76 | 11 |
| Career total | | | 491 | 70 | 20 | 1 | 23 | 2 | 11 | 1 | 545 | 74 |

== Honours ==
Cardiff City

- FA Cup runner-up: 2007–08
