= Michael Chopra =

English footballer (born 1983)

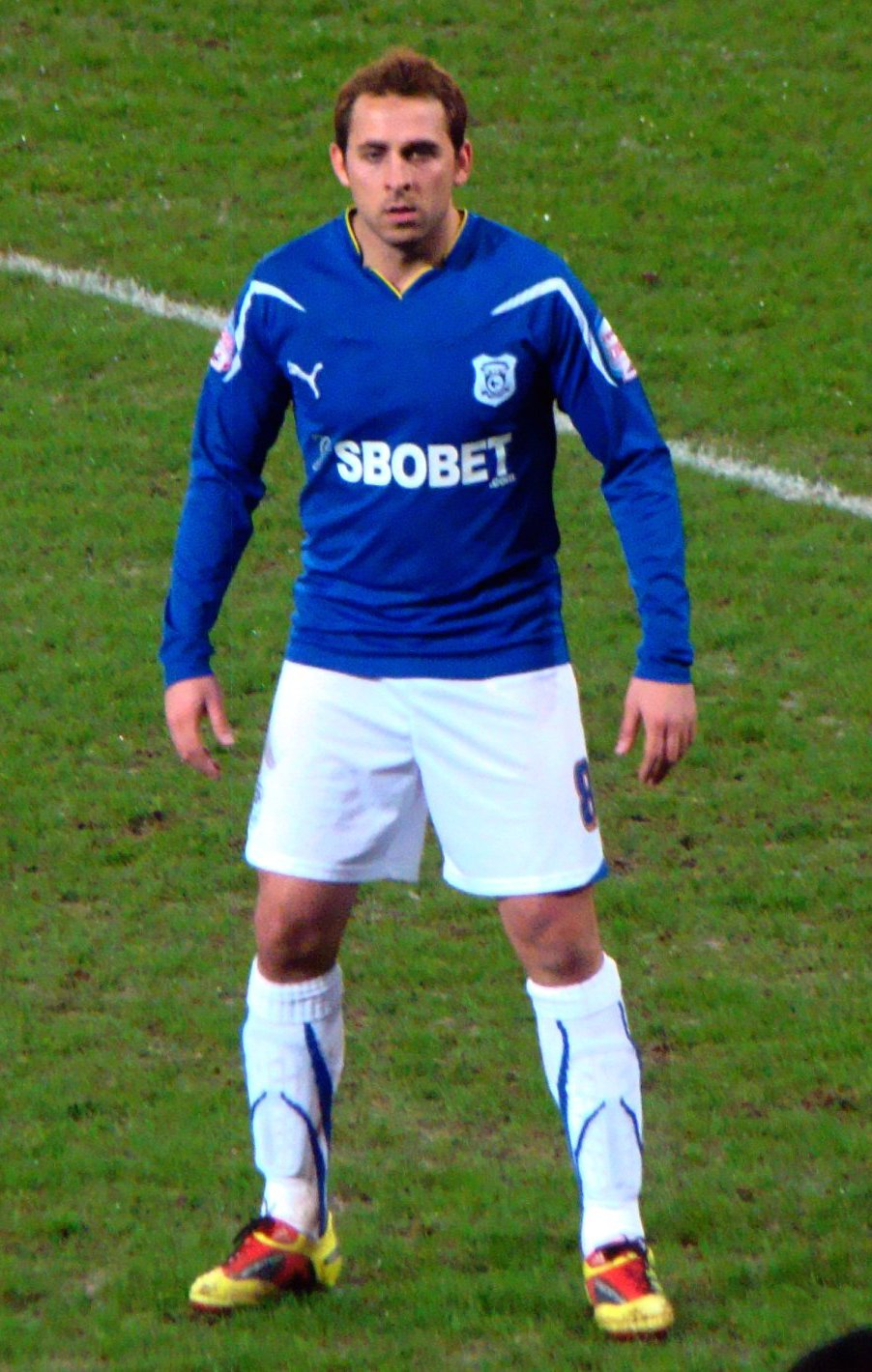
- Chopra playing for Cardiff City in 2011.

Personal information
- Full name: Rocky Michael Chopra
- Date of birth: 23 December 1983 (age 42)
- Place of birth: Newcastle upon Tyne, England
- Height: 5 ft 9 in (1.75 m)
- Position: Striker

Team information
- Current team: Trethomas Bluebirds
- Number: 20

Youth career
- 1993–2000: Newcastle United

Senior career*
Years	Team	Apps	(Gls)
2000–2006	Newcastle United	21	(1)
2003	→ Watford (loan)	5	(5)
2004	→ Nottingham Forest (loan)	5	(0)
2004–2005	→ Barnsley (loan)	39	(17)
2006–2007	Cardiff City	42	(22)
2007–2009	Sunderland	39	(8)
2008	→ Cardiff City (loan)	11	(5)
2009	→ Cardiff City (loan)	16	(4)
2009–2011	Cardiff City	73	(25)
2011–2013	Ipswich Town	78	(18)
2013–2014	Blackpool	18	(0)
2014	Kerala Blasters	9	(0)
2015–2016	Alloa Athletic	23	(2)
2016	Kerala Blasters	10	(1)
2022	West Allotment Celtic	0	(0)
2026–	Trethomas Bluebirds	2	(0)
Total		390	(108)

International career
1997–1999	England U16	10	(0)
1999–2000	England U17	5	(0)
2000–2001	England U19	7	(0)
2001–2003	England U20	9	(0)
- * Club domestic league appearances and goals as of 09:15, 8 November 2026 (UTC)

Rocky Michael Chopra (born 23 December 1983) is an English professional footballer who plays as a striker for Cymru South club Trethomas Bluebirds.

A product of the Newcastle United youth system, he spent six years at the club without managing to secure a regular first team place, instead spending time on loan at Watford, Nottingham Forest, and Barnsley. He was sold to Cardiff City for £500,000 in June 2006, and won a place on the PFA Team of the Year for his performances in the 2006–07 season. He then made a £5 million move to Premier League side Sunderland in July 2007, before returning to Cardiff on a loan deal that was made permanent in July 2009 for £3 million. He again was included in the PFA Team of the Year for the 2009–10 campaign, before being sold on to Ipswich Town for £1 million in June 2011. He joined Blackpool on a free transfer in July 2013, before moving to the Indian Super League with the Kerala Blasters for the inaugural 2014 season. Chopra signed for Scottish club Alloa Athletic in March 2015, playing for the side for a year before being released in March 2016. He returned to India to play for the Kerala Blasters again before retiring. In 2022 Chopra came out of retirement to play for West Allotment Celtic, and again in 2026 with Welsh side Trethomas Bluebirds.

He has represented England at the under-16, under-17, under-19 and under-20 levels.

== Club career ==
=== Newcastle United ===
Born in Newcastle upon Tyne, Tyne and Wear, Chopra attended Gosforth High School in Newcastle, and owing to his goal-scoring exploits there, and later with the Montagu Boys' Club, was recruited to the Newcastle United academy in July 1993. Being an unused substitute for Newcastle in a Premier League match against Charlton Athletic in October 2002, Chopra signed a three-year contract with the club on 30 October.

Chopra made his professional debut on 6 November, at St James' Park against Everton in the League Cup. Coming on as a substitute for Lomana LuaLua, he missed a penalty kick in the shootout, sending Everton to the round of 16. He made his UEFA Champions League debut in December 2002 against Barcelona. Coming on as a substitute for Lualua, in the final minutes of the match, Newcastle was handed a 3–1 defeat.

Further playing once for the club against Bayer Leverkusen, Chopra was loaned to second-tier club Watford for five matches on 25 March 2003. During his short loan spell, he scored five goals in as many matches, which included four goals against Burnley. Being behind Alan Shearer, Craig Bellamy, Shola Ameobi and LuaLua in the pecking order, Watford manager Ray Lewington expressed his desire to re-sign him on loan for the next season. He said that Chopra "had an experience he wouldn't have believed a month ago having played in an FA Cup semi-final." On 11 May 2003, Chopra made his Premier League debut as the season ended with a 1–1 draw at West Bromwich Albion, he again replaced LuaLua with eight minutes remaining. In September of the same year, the BBC reported that Indian club Mohun Bagan was interested in signing him.

Failing to find a goal in the 2003–04 season, Newcastle loaned Chopra to Nottingham Forest for a month in February 2004. He failed to find the net, as he ended the season playing eleven times without scoring. At the start of the 2004–05 season, he was loaned for a month to League One club Barnsley in August. Making his debut against Hull City, he would score his first goal for Barnsley against Hartlepool United, opening a 1–1 draw at Victoria Park. Scoring a total of five goals, his loan was extended in November till the end of the season. In the rest of the season, Chopra scored twelve times – including two hat-tricks, one against Peterborough United and another against Huddersfield Town. New Barnsley boss Andy Ritchie intended to sign Chopra in the summer to play alongside Paul Hayes, but was unsuccessful.

Chopra began the 2005–06 season back in Newcastle's first team, scoring his first senior goal for Newcastle in the 3–1 away win to Slovak side Dubnica on 17 July in UEFA Intertoto Cup. Making his second start for Newcastle, he opened the scoring in the fourth minute of the match. In the second leg of the match, he suffered concussion, with Sky Sports reporting that he would miss the next game against Spanish club Deportivo de La Coruña. Nevertheless, he played in that match where he "slid home Charles N'Zogbia's cross at the far post". In a Tyne–Wear derby against Sunderland on 17 April 2006, Chopra scored his only Premier League goal and the fastest by a substitute – finding the net after coming on fifteen seconds earlier. Later in that season Chopra injured his knee ligaments, which he claimed to be the "worst injury" he ever had.

=== Cardiff City ===
After becoming frustrated at his failure to make an impact at Newcastle, Chopra signed for Cardiff City in June 2006 for £500,000. On his decision to leave Newcastle, Chopra stated that he had shown loyalty to the club and expressed his desire to receive the same loyalty from the club. He also added that he would love to return to Newcastle in the future. During the season, Chopra scored 22 goals in 44 matches. He helped the club remain top of the Championship throughout September, earning the Championship Player of the month for September. He was also featured in the PFA Team of the season (an annual award given to a set of 44 footballers in the top four tiers of English football).

=== Sunderland ===
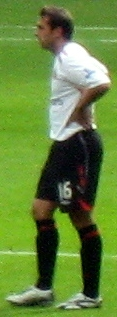
Chopra playing for Sunderland in 2007

In July 2007, newly promoted Premier League side Sunderland agreed a deal worth up to £5 million, activating a release clause, to sign Chopra on a four-year contract. His Geordie roots and high price-tag caused unrest among some Sunderland fans. He scored on his debut for the "Black Cats" on the opening day of the 2007–08 season at the Stadium of Light, coming on as a substitute late in the second half and scored the winning goal against Tottenham Hotspur in injury time. He scored in the next game at Birmingham City, but then went 15 games without scoring before he converted a penalty at Reading on 23 December. He went on to score the only goal of a 1–0 win over Aston Villa at Villa Park, before he scored his sixth and final goal of the season in Sunderland's 3–2 win over Tees–Wear derby rivals Middlesbrough, finishing as the second highest scorer at the club, being just one goal behind Kenwyne Jones. After missing the initial matches for "personal problems", he scored two goals in his second game of the 2008–09 season as Sunderland beat Middlesbrough 2–0 on 20 September.

With the arrivals of Djibril Cissé and El-Hadji Diouf, Chopra found his playing time to be limited. So he rejoined Cardiff City in November on a two-month loan. Chopra made his debut against Queens Park Rangers playing the entire ninety minutes of the 1–0 defeat. In the next match against Crystal Palace, he found his first goal. Chopra converted a 31st-minute penalty the saw Cardiff winning the match 2–1. Scoring five goals in this spell, he was recalled from loan by the new Sunderland manager Ricky Sbragia to the squad, with The Guardian writing that he was "excited" to return to the squad. Chopra rejoined Cardiff on loan in February 2009 for the rest of the season, with the transfer becoming permanent at the end of the season. Cardiff chairman Peter Ridsdale said that Chopra was "over the moon" about the transfer. During his second loan spell at the club, he found the net four times.

=== Return to Cardiff ===
"Michael Chopra is on fire, he's scored seven goals already and he's shown he will get the goals if he gets the supply."

— Dave Jones

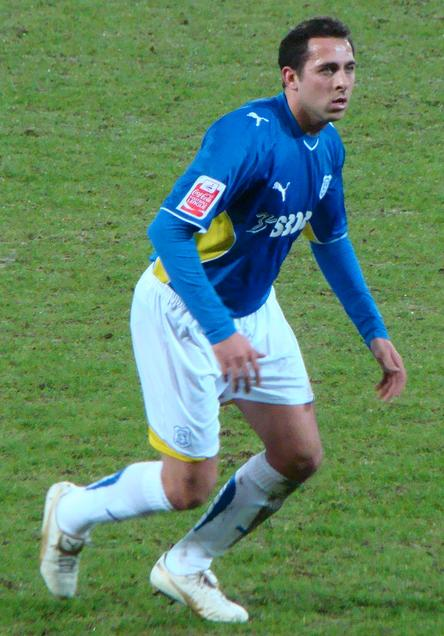
Chopra playing for Cardiff City in 2010

Chopra completed a permanent move on 1 July following the opening of the transfer window for a fee of £3 million. The transfer smashed the club's transfer record which was previously held by the £1.75 million signing of Peter Thorne from Stoke City in 2001. He scored on his debut, netting the first and third goals in a 4–0 victory over Scunthorpe United. Chopra then would score in consecutive matches against Blackpool, Plymouth Argyle, Bristol City and Bristol Rovers. In the post-match ceremony, manager Dave Jones commented, "Chopra is on fire, he's scored seven goals already and he's shown he will get the goals if he gets the supply". Chopra finished the season with a total of 21 goals, including a four-goal haul against Derby County. For a second time, he was included in the PFA Team of the Year.

After the season, Goal.com reported that Ipswich Town had lodged a £3 million bid to secure Chopra's services. Though it was increased, he continued the next season with Cardiff City. In the 2010–11 season, he suffered a hamstring injury during a match against Barnsley on 23 April 2011 ruling him out of action for 10 to 12 weeks. A statement released by the club confirmed the blow, speculating that they would be required to finish the season without him However, he would return to feature in both the legs of the Championship play-offs against Reading. In the second leg, he was near to scoring, only for his shot to be deflected by Reading captain Matt Mills.

=== Ipswich Town ===
On 10 June 2011, Chopra penned a three-year deal with Ipswich Town signing for an undisclosed fee, which was reported by East Anglian Daily Times to be £1.5 million. Manager Paul Jewell revealed that he was the type of player the club was searching for. After signing, Chopra said that he was hungry for goals. He started his Ipswich years with a bang scoring twice in his debut against Bristol City. He also scored a goal in each of the two matches against his former club Cardiff City. He ended the season as the club's top scorer with 14 goals. However, Chopra had a lackluster second season with the club, where he scored five times in thirty six matches. Unhappy with his performance, manager Mick McCarthy said that he was not in his plans for going forward and they were free to look for another club. Nevertheless, he found the winner goal in the dying minutes of a match against Watford. Though he missed a couple of chance earlier in the match, he was successful in converting Carlos Edwards low cross in the last minute of the encounter.

=== Blackpool ===
Though he was close to signing with Barnsley, Chopra signed for Blackpool in July 2013. Wales Online wrote that he joined the club to regain his "goal touch". He said that the Blackpool move was a fresh start for him. He also expressed his confidence of scoring goals playing alongside the two wingers – Tom Ince and Matt Phillips. In January of the following year, he was fined for a tweet in which he criticised the club's training schedules. During his time with the side, he made 20 appearances but failed to score in any of them.

=== Kerala Blasters ===
In August 2014, Chopra confirmed his participation in the inaugural season of the Indian Super League. He said that he felt honoured to "involved in this new era". He was drafted by Kerala Blasters which was managed by David James. In an interview, he said that he felt honoured to "play for a team that is owned by Sachin Tendulkar". He made his debut in the first match against NorthEast United, coming as a substitute in a 1–0 defeat, with The Times of India commenting that he "looked sharp". His time in India was cut short by an injury, which he suffered in a training for a match against Atlético de Kolkata. Goal.com criticized him for his poor "fitness level" and wrote that he never "impressed in the competition and failed to find the back of the net". Nevertheless, he played the 120 minutes of the semifinal against Chennaiyin, and also started the final against the Kolkatan side where he managed two shots on goal. He ended the season playing nine times without scoring.

Reflecting on his stint in first season of Indian Super League, Chopra admitted that ISL turned out to be much more intense and competitive than he had anticipated. He said: "I think there were a few things that went wrong; I underestimated the ISL. I thought it was going to be easier than it was, and then I picked up a hamstring injury in pre-season which set me back.

=== Alloa Athletic ===
On 17 March 2015, Chopra signed for Scottish Championship club Alloa Athletic for the rest of the season. On that very day, he made his debut against Rangers. On 2 May 2015, he scored his first goal for Alloa when he scored from six yards out in a league match against Cowdenbeath. Four days later, he scored his second goal for the club, as he opened the scoring in a 2–0 victory against Brechin City in the relegation play-offs. Chopra was released by Alloa due to injury in March 2016, exactly one year after he signed for the club.

=== Return to Kerala Blasters ===
On 7 August 2016, Chopra made a return to Kerala Blasters after not being retained by them in the second edition of the Indian Super League.

To show that his injury prone ankle would hold up to the rigours of the league and not affect the club's bid to bounce back from a poor finish in the previous season, Chopra had a three-week training stint with Pune outfit DSK Shivajians before joining the Blasters.

On 14 October 2016, he scored his first goal for Kerala Blasters, the only goal in a 1–0 win, playing at home against Mumbai City.

=== West Allotment Celtic ===
On 27 June 2022, Chopra signed for Northern League Division One side West Allotment Celtic. He retired after his time at the club.

=== Trethomas Bluebirds ===
On 1 July 2026, Chopra came out of retirement to sign for Cymru South side Trethomas Bluebirds. He made his debut for the club as a 90th-minute substitute in a Cymru South match against Caerphilly Athletic on 4 September 2026.

== International career ==
Chopra has represented England at under-16, under-17, under-19 and under-20 levels. He played in the 2000 UEFA European Under-16 Championship and the 2002 UEFA European Under-19 Championship.

Born and raised in England, Chopra is eligible to play for India through his father. In November 2010, Chopra entered into talks over acquiring an Indian passport in order to represent India in the 2011 AFC Asian Cup. However, without an Indian passport (though he carries an Overseas Citizenship of India), and the Indian government's refusal to change its stance on dual citizenship, Chopra cannot play for India without first renouncing his British citizenship. In August 2014, Chopra stated that he wanted to play for India at international level, and was willing to renounce his British citizenship to do so.

== Coaching career ==
Chopra retired from football in 2016, going on to work as a football agent in Amsterdam. In July 2017, it was reported that Chopra had enrolled on an AIFF D-License coaching course.

== Personal life ==
Chopra appeared in OK! magazine in October 2007 to announce he had become engaged to Heather Swan, and that they were expecting their first child. On 15 February 2008, a son was born. In July, it was reported that the couple had split only weeks after their £250,000 wedding, but they later reconciled as she vowed to "stand by him" as he entered rehab for his gambling addiction, which included a spell at the Sporting Chance clinic. In September 2008 the police were called to Chopra's home in response to a domestic abuse call. In 2009, Chopra was publicly dumped by his wife on Facebook. He was re-admitted to the same clinic for three weeks in October 2011. In December 2011, Ipswich Town gave Chopra a £250,000 loan to help pay off his gambling debts.

In December 2011, Chopra and his father were involved in a cocaine drugs trial in Newcastle upon Tyne crown court. On 4 October 2012, Chopra was one of three footballers among a group charged by the British Horseracing Authority (BHA) over an investigation into "suspicious betting activity". The allegations focus on horses being laid to lose on betting exchanges. On 25 January 2013, he was found guilty of this offence and given a 10-year ban from racing by the BHA. In 2014 he found himself in serious trouble with Blackpool FC after a foul-mouthed Twitter rant complaining about training.

In 2020, Chopra was involved in a consortium that sought to buy Newcastle United alongside fellow former Magpies striker Alan Shearer.

== Career statistics ==
Appearances and goals by club, season and competition
Club	Season	League			National cup		League cup		Continental		Other		Total	
Club	Season	Division	Apps	Goals	Apps	Goals	Apps	Goals	Apps	Goals	Apps	Goals	Apps	Goals
Newcastle United	2002–03	Premier League	1	0	0	0	1	0	2 (Note: Appearances in UEFA Champions League)	0	—		4	0
Newcastle United	2003–04	Premier League	6	0	0	0	0	0	—		—		6	0
Newcastle United	2004–05	Premier League	1	0	0	0	0	0	—		—		1	0
Newcastle United	2005–06	Premier League	13	1	2	1	2	0	3 (Note: Appearances in UEFA Intertoto Cup)	1	—		20	3
Newcastle United	Total		21	1	2	1	3	0	5	1	—		31	3
Watford (loan)	2002–03	First Division	5	5	1	0	0	0	—		—		6	5
Nottingham Forest (loan)	2003–04	First Division	5	0	0	0	0	0	—		—		5	0
Barnsley (loan)	2004–05	League One	39	17	1	0	1	0	—		1 (Note: Appearances in Football League Trophy)	0	42	17
Cardiff City	2006–07	Championship	42	22	2	0	0	0	—		—		44	22
Sunderland	2007–08	Premier League	33	6	0	0	1	0	—		—		34	6
Sunderland	2008–09	Premier League	6	2	1	0	1	0	—		—		8	2
Sunderland	Total		39	8	1	0	2	0	—		—		42	8
Cardiff City (loan)	2008–09	Championship	27	9	0	0	0	0	—		—		27	9
Cardiff City	2009–10	Championship	41	16	4	2	3	1	—		3 (Note: Appearances in Promotion Play-offs)	2	51	21
Cardiff City	2010–11	Championship	32	9	2	1	1	1	—		2	0	37	11
Cardiff City	Total		73	25	6	3	4	2	—		5	2	188	32
Ipswich Town	2011–12	Championship	45	14	1	0	0	0	—		—		46	14
Ipswich Town	2012–13	Championship	33	4	1	1	2	0	—		—		36	5
Ipswich Town	Total		78	18	2	1	2	0	—		—		82	19
Blackpool	2013–14	Championship	18	0	1	0	1	0	—		—		20	0
Kerala Blasters	2014	Indian Super League	9	0	—		—		—		—		9	0
Alloa Athletic	2014–15	Scottish Championship	8	1	—		—		—		5	2	13	3
Alloa Athletic	2015–16	Scottish Championship	15	1	1	0	0	0	—		1	0	17	1
Alloa Athletic	Total		23	2	1	0	0	0	—		6	2	30	4
Kerala Blasters	2016	Indian Super League	10	1	—		—		—		—		10	1
Career total			389	108	18	5	13	2	5	1	12	4	434	119

== Honours ==
Individual

- Football League Championship Player of the Month: September 2006
- Cardiff City Player of the Year: 2006–07
- PFA Team of the Year: 2006–07 Championship, 2009–10 Championship

== See also ==
- British Asians in association football
