= Iwan Redan =

Dutch footballer

Personal information
- Full name: Iwan Benito Marvin Redan
- Date of birth: 21 August 1980 (age 46)
- Place of birth: Rotterdam, Netherlands
- Height: 1.88 m (6 ft 2 in)
- Position: Striker

Team information
- Current team: Sparta Rotterdam

Youth career
- Germinal
- Neptunus
- Sparta Rotterdam
- 1998–1999: Vitesse Arnhem

Senior career*
Years	Team	Apps	(Gls)
1999–2000	Vitesse Arnhem	0	(0)
2000	→ RBC Roosendaal (loan)	9	(2)
2000–2004	RKC Waalwijk	47	(13)
2004	→ Roda JC (loan)	11	(5)
2004–2007	Willem II	52	(16)
2007	→ Cardiff City (loan)	2	(0)
2008	RBC Roosendaal	13	(1)
2009	Excelsior	1	(0)
2010	Sparta Rotterdam	4	(0)
2010–2011	Almere City	10	(3)
- * Club domestic league appearances and goals as of 1 July 2015 ‡ National team caps and goals as of 9 February 2010 (UTC)

Iwan Benito Marvin Redan (born 21 August 1980), better known as Iwan Redan, is a Dutch footballer who plays as a striker.

== Club career ==
=== 2000–2004: The beginnings ===
Born in Rotterdam, Redan started his career via amateur clubs Germinal and Neptunus in the Sparta Rotterdam youth squads. He signed his first professional contract with Vitesse Arnhem instead but was hired on loan by RBC Roosendaal, playing in the Eerste Divisie where he made his professional debut in a match against Excelsior Rotterdam on 5 March 2000 by replacing Miodrag Božović in the 62nd minute. Eventually he played nine matches and scores two goals before he moved to RKC Waalwijk where he made his Eredivisie debut. He became a first team regular, and was called up into the Dutch under-21 team. However, a long-term injury forced him to miss the whole 2001/02 season and most of the 2002/03 season.

After recovering he returned playing, but was no longer a first team regular at RKC and as a result he was sent on loan to Roda JC. As Yannis Anastasiou was leaving Roda JC at the end of the season the club wanted to sign Redan from RKC, but he was called back as the current RKC striker Rick Hoogendorp was also expected to leave. Hoogendorp eventually stayed and Redan was not used in the first period of the 2004/05 season and then moved to Willem II where he signed a 3-year deal.

=== 2004–2007: Willem II and rise to fame ===
At Willem II he became one of the team's key players and almost represented the team in all of their league games. However, in late December 2005 he and Dutch international player Kevin Bobson were relegated to Willem II's second team because their mental and physical performances were considered to be weak. As a result, Redan wanted to leave the club and went on trial to several clubs like Preston North End, Sheffield Wednesday, Ipswich Town and CD Numancia, but did never sign a contract and returned to Willem II. Since then he hardly played any matches until he became a regular again in the 2006/07 season and even became the team's captain. Willem II was however performing badly and was found in the lower rankings of the league all the time. During a KNVB Cup match against De Graafschap Redan headbutted teammate Kristof Imschoot and the Willem II board decided Redan had to leave the club.

=== 2007–: downfall ===
Redan was not sold, but found himself on loan to Cardiff City. He failed to establish himself in the squad and at the end of the season he returned to Willem II but was released by the club at the end of the year. He had a trial for Aris but he did not persuade the head coach Dušan Bajević.

== Statistics ==
Season	Club	Competition	Apps	Goals
1999/00	Vitesse Arnhem	Eredivisie	0	0
1999/00	RBC Roosendaal	Eerste Divisie	9	2
2000/01	RKC Waalwijk	Eredivisie	24	5
2001/02	RKC Waalwijk	Eredivisie	0	0
2002/03	RKC Waalwijk	Eredivisie	5	0
2003/04	RKC Waalwijk	Eredivisie	18	8
2003/04	Roda JC	Eredivisie	11	5
2004/05	RKC Waalwijk	Eredivisie	0	0
2004/05	Willem II Tilburg	Eredivisie	26	6
2005/06	Willem II Tilburg	Eredivisie	11	8
2006/07	Willem II Tilburg	Eredivisie	15	2
2006/07	Cardiff City	Championship	2	0
Total			121	36
