= Luigi Glombard =

French footballer (born 1984)

Personal information
- Date of birth: 21 August 1984 (age 42)
- Place of birth: Montreuil-sous-Bois, France
- Height: 1.79 m (5 ft 10 1/2 in)
- Position: Striker

Senior career*
Years	Team	Apps	(Gls)
2002–2006	Nantes	29	(2)
2006–2007	Cardiff City	6	(0)
2007	→ Leicester City (loan)	1	(0)
2007	→ Oldham Athletic (loan)	8	(1)
2007–2008	Grenoble	30	(4)
2008–2009	Niort	26	(5)
2010–2014	Niort	130	(23)
2014–2015	Orléans	33	(3)
2015–2017	Les Herbiers	42	(1)

International career
2002–2003	France U18	11	(0)
- * Club domestic league appearances and goals as of 07:22, 22 August 2017 (UTC)

Luigi Glombard (born 21 August 1984) is a French professional footballer who plays as a striker. He was most recently contracted to Les Herbiers.

== Club career ==
Glombard joined the Nantes academy in 2000 and made his senior debut in 2002. He joined Cardiff City in the summer of 2006 but moved on transfer deadline day to Leicester City for an initial one-month loan, subject to Football League paperwork.

He made his Leicester City debut coming on as a sub in the 2nd half against Ipswich Town, but never made another appearance and returned to Cardiff on 27 February 2007. A loan spell at Oldham Athletic then materialised with Glombard scoring once against Bradford in three starts for the Latics. In May 2007 Glombard was released from Cardiff City and went on to sign for Grenoble Foot 38, spending one year at the club before joining Chamois Niortais in 2008. He scored five goals in his first season in Niort, but left the club after they were relegated to the Championnat de France amateur in 2009. On 5 January 2010, he re-signed for the club, and scored on his second debut for the team, netting the second goal in the 2–0 win over Genets Anglet.

== International career ==
Glombard has represented France at under-17 level, competing in the 2001 Under-17 World Championships, playing alongside the likes of Anthony Le Tallec and Florent Sinama Pongolle.
