= Curtis McDonald =

Welsh footballer

Personal information
- Date of birth: 24 March 1988 (age 38)
- Place of birth: Cardiff, Wales
- Position: Defender

Youth career
- –2006: Cardiff City

Senior career*
Years	Team	Apps	(Gls)
2006–2007	Cardiff City	1	(0)
2006	→ Accrington Stanley (loan)	0	(0)
2007	Carmarthen Town	4	(1)
2007–2008	MKS Swit	0	(0)
2008–2010	Forest Green Rovers	38	(0)
2010	Forest Green Rovers	14	(1)
2011	Newport County	5	(0)
2011	→ Forest Green Rovers (loan)	7	(1)
2011–2012	Forest Green Rovers	11	(1)
2012	→ Brackley Town (loan)	5	(0)
2012–2016	Brackley Town	75	(0)
2016	Merthyr Town	?	(?)
2017–2020	Chippenham Town	?	(?)
2020–2024	Barry Town United	90	(3)

International career^{‡}
2003	Wales U17	3	(0)
2005–2006	Wales U19	6	(1)
2005–2006	Wales U21	3	(0)
2009–	Wales Semi-Pro	4	(0)
- * Club domestic league appearances and goals as of 22 April 2024 ‡ National team caps and goals as of 14 October 2010

Curtis McDonald (born 24 March 1988) is a Welsh footballer who plays as a left-sided defender.

== Club career ==
Born in Cardiff, Curtis made his debut for Cardiff City on 30 April 2006 against Coventry City in the Football League Championship. On 24 November, he joined Accrington Stanley on loan, making one appearance during a 2–0 defeat to Doncaster Rovers in the Football League Trophy as a substitute replacing Andy Todd. He returned to the Bluebirds, coming off the bench to score two goals, including the winner, on his Cardiff City debut, away at Carmarthen Town in the FAW Premier Cup but, at the end of the 2006–07 season he was released by Cardiff.

After a few months playing for Welsh Premier League side Carmarthen Town, he moved to Poland, joining MKS Swit, alongside fellow Welshman Gianluca Palladino, in an arrangement with M&M sports management. He stated that his aim was to return to England during the November break in Poland and earn a deal at a Football League club.

He eventually returned to Britain and signed a 6-month deal at Forest Green Rovers, linking up with former Cardiff teammate Stuart Fleetwood. He made his debut in a 1–1 draw with Kettering Town on 9 August 2008 and stayed on for the 2008–09 campaign at The New Lawn on non-contract terms and signed on for the following season when again offered a contract to stay.

McDonald left the club at the end of the 2009–10 season and trialled with Football League sides, Stockport County and Leyton Orient, however he did not earn a contract and re-joined Forest Green. He celebrated his return by scoring the third goal in a 4–3 victory for Rovers against Hayes & Yeading United.

On 28 December 2010, he signed for fellow Conference National side Newport County. His spell with Newport was disappointing however and in March 2011 McDonald re-signed for Forest Green on loan. This move was made permanent on 31 May 2011 when he signed a one-year contract with the Nailsworth club.

A lengthy injury lay off saw McDonald miss the majority of the 2011–12 season. After returning to fitness, McDonald was loaned out to Brackley Town and made his debut on 7 April 2012 against Hemel Hempstead Town. McDonald went on to become part of the Brackley team that were crowned Southern Premier Division champions as a draw with Oxford City on 21 April 2012 was enough to earn the club promotion. At the end of the season McDonald was released by Forest Green and he joined Brackley on a permanent basis.

In July 2016, McDonald signed for Southern League side Merthyr Town.

In 2017, McDonald signed for newly promoted Chippenham Town in the National League South

== International career ==
Curtis has played three times for the Wales under-21 team. He has also played at under-19 and under-17 level.

In November 2009, McDonald made his debut for the Wales semi-professional side in a 2–2 draw with Northern Ireland.
