= Lee Worgan =

English footballer

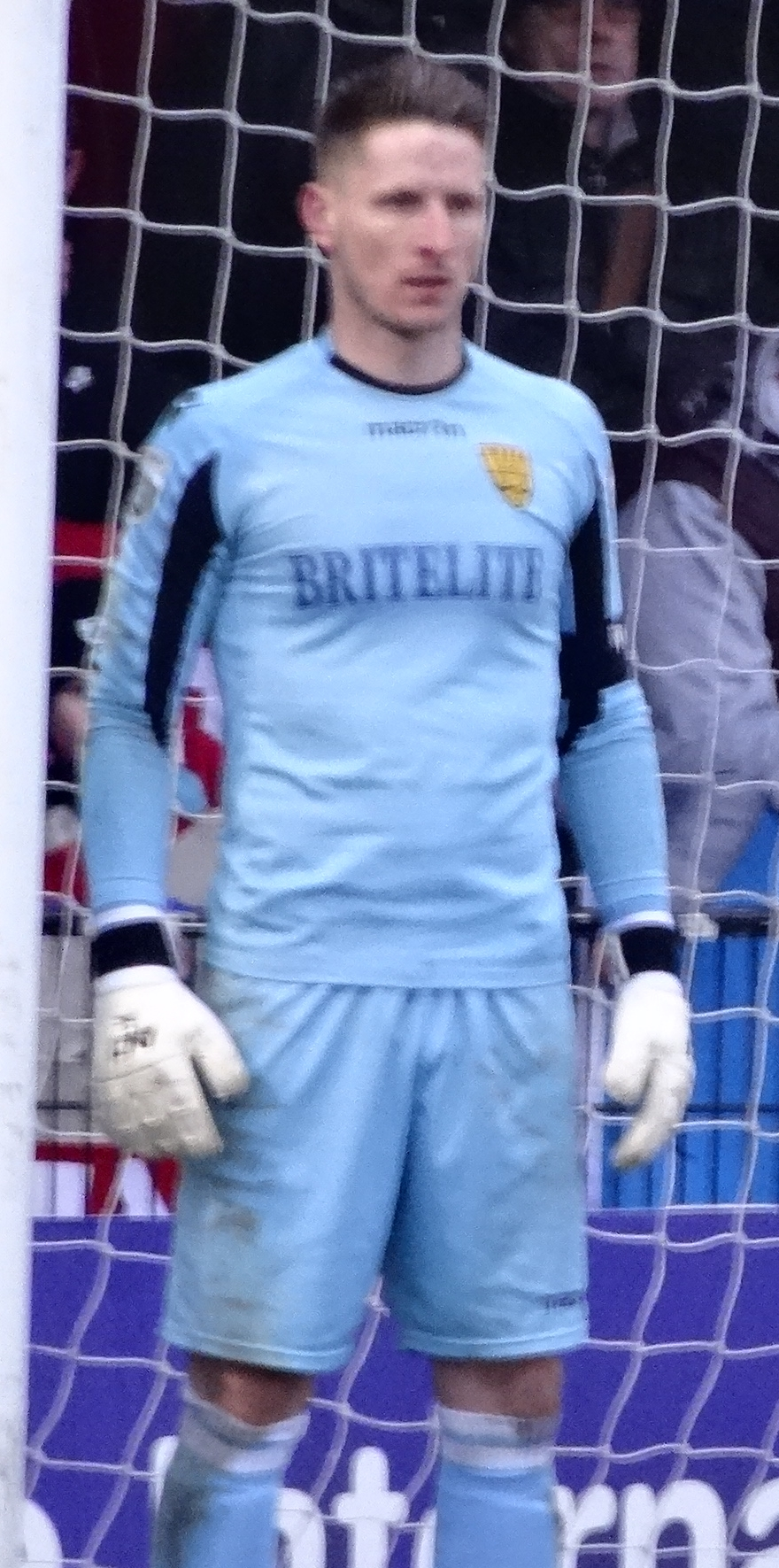
- Worgan playing for Maidstone United in 2017

Personal information
- Full name: Lee John Worgan
- Date of birth: 1 December 1983 (age 42)
- Place of birth: Eastbourne, England
- Height: 1.82 m (6 ft 0 in)
- Position: Goalkeeper

Team information
- Current team: Welling United (player-goalkeeping coach)

Youth career
- Wimbledon

Senior career*
Years	Team	Apps	(Gls)
2002–2004	Wimbledon	3	(0)
2002–2003	→ Aylesbury United (loan)	20	(0)
2004	→ Wycombe Wanderers (loan)	2	(0)
2004–2005	Rushden & Diamonds	7	(0)
2005–2006	Cardiff City	0	(0)
2006	→ Merthyr Tydfil (loan)	7	(0)
2006	Eastbourne Borough	0	(0)
2006–2008	Hastings United	89	(0)
2008–2013	Tonbridge Angels	238	(0)
2013–2018	Maidstone United	243	(0)
2018–2020	Dover Athletic	34	(0)
2020–2021	Chelmsford City	18	(0)
2021	Dorking Wanderers	5	(0)
2021–2023	Eastbourne Borough	89	(0)
2023	Welling United	0	(0)
Total		743	(0)

International career
2001	Wales U19	2	(0)
2004–2005	Wales U21	5	(0)
- * Club domestic league appearances and goals

Lee John Worgan (born 1 December 1983) is a former footballer who played as a goalkeeper.

== Club career ==
=== Early career ===
Worgan began his career by coming through the youth ranks at Wimbledon and was one of a few players to stay with the squad during the move to become Milton Keynes Dons. However, he never managed to establish himself there. He spent two weeks on loan at Wycombe Wanderers during the 2003–04 season when they suffered a goalkeeper injury crisis with Steve Williams, Frank Talia, and Tom Gott all out injured.

In August 2004, he joined Rushden & Diamonds on a free transfer but again failed to establish himself, and at the end of the year, he was released and was signed by Cardiff City on another free transfer. He did not make a league appearance for Cardiff but did play in the FAW Premier Cup on one occasion. He was released by Cardiff at the end of the 2005–06 season after having spent some of the season on loan at Merthyr Tydfil.

Since then, he has played for Eastbourne Borough. In October 2006, he signed for Isthmian League Premier Division side Hastings United, making his debut in a 2–1 win over Croydon Athletic in the FA Trophy. In his first year, after helping the side to promotion, he was unanimously voted the Supporters' Club player of the year and was quickly offered a one-year extension to his contract.

=== Tonbridge Angels ===
In May 2008, he signed for Tonbridge Angels. He received a red card on his competitive debut for Tonbridge against Wealdstone.

In March 2011, he won the 'Sells Goalkeeping Academy Good Hands' award for the best defensive record in the Isthmian League Premier Division that month, conceding three goals in six games.

Worgan was named Tonbridge Angels player of the year for the 2010/11 season, with performances against Bury Town and Wealdstone particularly impressing fans.

At the end of the 2012–13 season, Worgan was named in the Conference South team of the year with performances against Dover, Salisbury, Hayes and Yeading, particularly impressing managers and fans alike. Still, after five years at Tonbridge, more than 200 appearances in all competitions, and one promotion, Worgan announced that he was leaving the club.

=== Maidstone United ===
On 15 May 2013, Worgan joined Isthmian League Premier Division side Maidstone United. The stopper cited the size of the club and its infrastructure as his reasons for the move. He swept up the club's Player of the Season awards in his debut season, receiving the accolade from supporters, teammates, and the manager.

He was a pivotal part of the side that won promotion to the National League South in 2014-15 and made his 100th consecutive league appearance for the club on 5 September 2015 in the 0 – 0 draw away at Gosport Borough. Following the departure of Steve Watt, Worgan was made club captain at the Gallagher Stadium.

Worgan was once again a vital cog in the Stones machine that won an unlikely promotion to the National League at the climax of the 2015–16 season, with the goalkeeper going down in club folklore for his promotion-winning penalty save from Danny Kedwell in the playoff final against Ebbsfleet United. The promotion meant the club had gone up three times in 4 years, and it was Worgan's second consecutive promotion with the club.

During the 2016–17 season, Worgan's first ever in the top tier of non-league football, he made his 150th consecutive league appearance for the Maidstone against Gateshead in October 2016.

=== Dover Athletic ===
On 29 October 2018, Worgan joined Kent rivals Dover Athletic on a 2 1/2-year deal that would also see him take up a coaching role. He made his debut for the club in a 2–2 home draw with Havant and Waterlooville in the FA Trophy first round.

On 12 August 2020, Worgan had his contract terminated by mutual consent in order to focus on a full-time career in teaching.

=== Chelmsford City ===
On 13 August 2020, Worgan stepped down a division, signing for Chelmsford City. Following the culmination of the 2020–21 National League South season, Worgan departed Chelmsford.

=== Dorking Wanderers ===
In May 2021, Worgan joined National League South side Dorking Wanderers. After making just 5 appearances for the Wanderers, Dorking mutually agreed to terminate Worgan's contract for personal reasons.

=== Eastbourne Borough ===
On 9 September 2021, Worgan returned to Eastbourne Borough. He made his long-awaited debut for Eastbourne in a National League South match against Hemel Hempstead, having never made an appearance in his first spell with the club.

=== Welling United ===
On 19 June 2023, Worgan signed for Welling United in a player-goalkeeping coach capacity. In October 2023, Worgan announced his retirement.

== International career ==
Worgan has played for Wales through most youth levels and was a regular in the Wales U21 team for several years.

== Career statistics ==
As of match played 29 April 2023 (Note: Statistics for 2005/06 loan at Merthyr Tydfil, 2007/08 at Hastings United and, 2008/09 and 2009/10 at Tonbridge Angels are missing due to a lack of sources)

Appearances and goals by club, season and competition
Club	Season	League			FA Cup		League Cup		Other		Total	
Club	Season	Division	Apps	Goals	Apps	Goals	Apps	Goals	Apps	Goals	Apps	Goals
Wimbledon	2002–03	First Division	0	0	0	0	0	0	0	0	0	0
Wimbledon	2003–04	First Division	3	0	0	0	0	0	0	0	3	0
Wimbledon	Total		3	0	0	0	0	0	0	0	3	0
Aylesbury United (loan)	2002–03	Isthmian League; Premier Division	20	0	0	0	—		12 (Note: Six appearances in FA Trophy, four appearances in Berks & Bucks Senior Cup, two appearances in Isthmian League Cup)	0	32	0
Wycombe Wanderers (loan)	2003–04	Second Division	2	0	0	0	0	0	0	0	2	0
Rushden & Diamonds	2004–05	League Two	7	0	0	0	0	0	1 (Note: Appearance(s) in Maunsell Cup)	0	8	0
Cardiff City	2005–06	Championship	0	0	0	0	0	0	1 (Note: Appearance(s) in FAW Premier Cup)	0	1	0
Eastbourne Borough	2006–07	Conference South	0	0	0	0	—		0	0	0	0
Hastings United	2006–07	Isthmian League; Division One South	41	0	0	0	—		0	0	41	0
Tonbridge Angels	2011–12	Conference South	42	0	1	0	—		0	0	43	0
Tonbridge Angels	2012–13	Conference South	39	0	0	0	—		3 (Note: Appearance(s) in FA Trophy)	0	42	0
Tonbridge Angels	Total		81	0	1	0	0	0	3	0	85	0
Maidstone United	2013–14	Isthmian League; Premier Division	46	0	2	0	—		6 (Note: Three appearances in FA Trophy, three appearances in Isthmian League Cup)	0	54	0
Maidstone United	2014–15	Isthmian League; Premier Division	46	0	7	0	—		2	0	55	0
Maidstone United	2015–16	National League South	42	0	4	0	—		6 (Note: Three appearances in National League South play-offs, two appearances in FA Trophy, one appearance in Isthmian League Charity Shield)	0	52	0
Maidstone United	2016–17	National League	46	0	3	0	—		3 (Note: Two appearances in FA Trophy, one appearance in Kent Senior Cup)	0	52	0
Maidstone United	2017–18	National League	46	0	4	0	—		7 (Note: Four appearances in FA Trophy, three appearances in Kent Senior Cup)	0	57	0
Maidstone United	2018–19	National League	17	0	1	0	—		0	0	18	0
Maidstone United	Total		243	0	21	0	0	0	24	0	288	0
Dover Athletic	2018–19	National League	10	0	0	0	—		2	0	12	0
Dover Athletic	2019–20	National League	24	0	1	0	—		0	0	25	0
Dover Athletic	Total		34	0	1	0	0	0	2	0	37	0
Chelmsford City	2020–21	National League South	16	0	1	0	—		1	0	18	0
Dorking Wanderers	2021–22	National League South	5	0	0	0	—		0	0	5	0
Eastbourne Borough	2021–22	National League South	33	0	3	0	—		3 (Note: Two appearances in FA Trophy, one appearance in National League South play-offs)	0	39	0
Eastbourne Borough	2022–23	National League South	44	0	3	0	—		2	0	49	0
Eastbourne Borough	Total		77	0	6	0	0	0	5	0	88	0
Career total			529	0	30	0	0	0	49	0	608	0
