= Danny Thomas (footballer, born 1985) =

Welsh footballer

Personal information
- Full name: Daniel Thomas
- Date of birth: 13 May 1985 (age 41)
- Place of birth: Cardiff, Wales
- Height: 1.70 m (5 ft 7 in)
- Position: Midfielder

Youth career
- ?–2004: Cardiff City

Senior career*
Years	Team	Apps	(Gls)
2004–2005	Cardiff City	1	(0)
2005–2010	Carmarthen Town	148	(56)
2010–	Haverfordwest County	0	(0)
- Bridgend Town
2012	Carmarthen Town		
- Abercarn United AFC
- * Club domestic league appearances and goals as of 27 April 2010

Danny Thomas (born 13 May 1985 in Cardiff) is a retired Welsh former professional footballer. In his professional and semi-professional career, he played for Cardiff City and Carmarthen Town, Haverfordwest County and Bridgend Town. He has played for Wales at Under 17 and Under 19 level.

== Career ==
Thomas began his career as a trainee with Cardiff City, turning professional in July 2004. After impressing in the reserve side he was handed his league debut on 19 November 2004 when he was brought on as a second-half substitute for Chris Barker in the 1–0 defeat at home to Preston North End. He played in the FAW Premier Cup defeat to Bangor City later in the season but it would be his last appearance for Cardiff and he was released in May 2005.

He joined Carmarthen Town in July 2005 and since become a prolific goalscorer, scoring his 50th league goal for the side on 28 November 2009 during a 3–1 win over Bala Town. In June 2010, Thomas moved to local rivals Haverfordwest County.

A move to Bridgend Town, before a short-lived return to Carmarthen Town in the summer of 2012. He retired from Welsh Premier League football in October 2012 to join the Cardiff City Academy as coach to their Under-10 players
