= Andrea Ferretti (footballer, born 1986) =

Italian footballer (born 1986)

Personal information
- Date of birth: 18 September 1986 (age 40)
- Place of birth: Montecchio Emilia, Italy
- Height: 1.78 m (5 ft 10 in)
- Position: Striker

Team information
- Current team: Borgo San Donnino

Senior career*
Years	Team	Apps	(Gls)
2004–2005	Parma	0	(0)
2005–2007	Cardiff City	5	(0)
2006	→ Scunthorpe United (loan)	4	(0)
2007–2009	Cesena	20	(3)
2009–2011	Pavia	59	(21)
2011–2012	Spezia	6	(0)
2012	→ Carpi (loan)	15	(5)
2012–2013	Carpi	14	(5)
2013–2014	Grosseto	16	(5)
2014–2016	Pavia	31	(16)
2016–2017	Trapani	12	(1)
2017–2019	FeralpiSalò	77	(14)
2019–2020	Triestina	14	(1)
2020	→ Imolese (loan)	6	(0)
2020–2021	Carpi	28	(8)
2021	San Secondo		
2021–2022	Crema	35	(20)
2022	Correggese	15	(4)
2022–	Borgo San Donnino	1	(0)
- * Club domestic league appearances and goals as of 8 October 2023

Andrea Ferretti (born 18 September 1986) is an Italian footballer who plays as a striker for Serie D club Borgo San Donnino.

== Biography ==
Ferretti joined the youth academy of Italian club Parma at the age of eight before being released in 2005. He was offered a trial at Football League Championship club Cardiff City, after being highly recommended by Manchester United manager Sir Alex Ferguson. After a successful trial and scoring a goal in a pre-season win over Scottish side Hamilton Academical, he was signed on a two-year professional contract.

In August 2006, having yet to start a game or score a goal for the Bluebirds first team, he was loaned out to Football League One club Scunthorpe United for an initial one-month period. He made our substitute appearances or Scunthorpe before returning to his parent club in early September of the same year after his loan came to an end. and heads for Spain On 12 April 2007, Ferretti parted company with Cardiff by mutual consent. His contract was due to expire in June 2007. He joined Cesena in the 2007 pre-season.

=== Spezia ===
On 4 July 2011 Ferretti was signed by Spezia in a 2-year contract.

=== Carpi ===
On 16 January 2012 Ferretti was loaned to Carpi. On 28 August 2012 Ferretti joined Carpi outright.

=== Grosseto ===
On 12 December 2013 he was signed by Grosseto.

=== Trapani & FeralpiSalò ===
In summer 2016 Ferretti was signed by Trapani. On 5 January 2017 he was signed by Lega Pro club FeralpiSalò, wearing number 11 shirt.

=== Triestina ===
On 1 August 2019, he signed a 2-year contract with Triestina. On 17 January 2020, he was loaned by Imolese. On 5 October 2020 his Triestina contract was terminated by mutual consent.
