= 1999–2000 Cardiff City F.C. season =

Welsh football club season

Cardiff City
1999–2000 season
- Chairman: Steve Borley
- Manager: Frank Burrows/Billy Ayre
- Football League Second Division: 21st
- FA Cup: 3rd round
- League Cup: 2nd round
- FAW Premier Cup: Runners-up
- Auto Windscreens Shield: 1st round
- Top goalscorer: League: Jason Bowen (12); All: Jason Bowen & Kevin Nugent (17)
- Highest home attendance: 11,168 (v Wrexham, 20 August 1999)
- Lowest home attendance: 4,389 (v Bournemouth, 7 March 2000)
- Average home league attendance: 6,903

The 1999 – 2000 season was Cardiff City F.C.'s 73rd season in the Football League. They competed in the 24-team Division Two, then the third tier of English football, finishing twenty-first, suffering relegation to Division Three. During the season manager Frank Burrows parted company with the club, being replaced by Billy Ayre.

== Players ==
Note: Flags indicate national team as defined under FIFA eligibility rules; some limited exceptions apply. Players may hold more than one non-FIFA nationality.

No.	Pos.	Nation	Player
--	GK	USA	Ian Feuer
--	GK	ENG	Jon Hallworth
--	GK	IRL	Seamus Kelly
--	DF	ENG	Jeff Eckhardt
--	DF	NED	Winston Faerber
--	DF	ENG	Mike Ford
--	DF	WAL	Lee Jarman
--	DF	WAL	Andy Legg
--	DF	WAL	Josh Low
--	DF	ENG	Russell Perrett
--	DF	WAL	Lee Phillips
--	DF	GER	Jörn Schwinkendorf
--	DF	ENG	Tony Vaughan
--	DF	WAL	Scott Young
--	MF	IRL	Willie Boland
--	MF	ENG	Mark Bonner

No.	Pos.	Nation	Player
--	MF	WAL	Jason Bowen
--	MF	ENG	Matt Brazier
--	MF	ENG	Richard Carpenter
--	MF	ENG	John Cornforth
--	MF	ENG	Jason Fowler
--	MF	ENG	Danny Hill
--	MF	ENG	Ritchie Humphreys
--	MF	ENG	Craig Middleton
--	MF	WAL	Christian Roberts
--	FW	ENG	Paul Brayson
--	FW	WAL	Robert Earnshaw
--	FW	ENG	Jamie Hughes
--	FW	WAL	Kurt Nogan
--	FW	ENG	Kevin Nugent
--	FW	WAL	Dai Thomas

First team squad.

== League table ==
Pos	Team	Pld	W	D	L	GF	GA	GD	Pts	Promotion or relegation
19	Cambridge United	46	12	12	22	64	65	−1	48	
20	Oxford United	46	12	9	25	43	73	−30	45	
21	Cardiff City (R)	46	9	17	20	45	67	−22	44	Relegation to the Third Division
22	Blackpool (R)	46	8	17	21	49	77	−28	41	Relegation to the Third Division
23	Scunthorpe United (R)	46	9	12	25	40	74	−34	39	Relegation to the Third Division

Rules for classification: 1) Points; 2) Goal difference; 3) Goals scored
(R) Relegated

=== Results by round ===
Round	1	2	3	4	5	6	7	8	9	10	11	12	13	14	15	16	17	18	19	20	21	22	23	24	25	26	27	28	29	30	31	32	33	34	35	36	37	38	39	40	41	42	43	44	45	46
Ground	H	A	H	A	H	A	H	H	A	A	A	H	H	A	H	A	H	A	H	A	A	H	A	H	A	H	A	H	A	H	H	A	H	H	A	H	A	A	H	A	H	A	H	A	A	H
Result	D	W	D	L	D	L	W	D	L	L	D	D	L	L	D	L	W	W	L	L	L	W	D	L	D	D	L	L	D	D	D	L	D	L	D	W	D	W	L	D	L	W	L	L	L	W
Position	~	7	9	14	13	18	14	15	16	17	16	16	17	18	18	19	18	14	17	19	20	17	18	18	17	17	19	19	19	21	21	21	22	23	23	22	22	20	21	21	22	20	21	21	21	21
Points	1	4	5	5	6	6	9	10	10	10	11	12	12	12	13	13	16	19	19	19	19	22	23	23	24	25	25	25	26	27	28	28	29	29	30	33	34	37	37	38	38	41	41	41	41	44

A = Away; H = Home; W = Win; D = Draw; L = Loss

== Fixtures and results ==
=== Second Division ===
7 August 1999 1	Cardiff City	1–1	Millwall	Cardiff
15:00	Willie Boland 45' (pen.)		36' (pen.) Neil Harris	Stadium: Ninian Park; Attendance: 10,193

14 August 1999 2	Oxford United	2–3	Cardiff City	Oxford
	Matt Murphy 67' (pen.), 73'		17' Winston Faerber; 41', 85' Kevin Nugent	Stadium: Manor Ground; Attendance: 6,423

20 August 1999 3	Cardiff City	1–1	Wrexham	Cardiff
19:30	Jason Bowen 37'	Wrexham report	55' Ian Stevens; (red card) 67' Gareth Owen	Stadium: Ninian Park; Attendance: 11,168; Referee: Rob Styles (Dorset)

28 August 1999 4	Luton Town	1–0	Cardiff City	Luton
15:00	Phil Gray 81'	Luton report		Stadium: Kenilworth Road; Attendance: 5,374; Referee: Roger Furnandiz (Doncaster)

30 August 1999 5	Cardiff City	1–1	Scunthorpe United	Cardiff
15:00	Jamie Hughes 88'		25' Guy Ipoua	Stadium: Ninian Park; Attendance: 8,006

11 September 1999 6	Wycombe Wanderers	3–1	Cardiff City	High Wycombe
	Matthew Lawrence 18'; Jermaine McSporran 75'; Andy Baird 79'		12' Jason Bowen	Stadium: Adams Park; Attendance: 4,982

18 September 1999 7	Cardiff City	2–1	Notts County	Cardiff
15:00	Jason Bowen 62'; Jeff Eckhardt 81'		55' Mark Stallard	Stadium: Ninian Park; Attendance: 6,568

25 September 1999 8	Cardiff City	0–0	Wigan Athletic	Cardiff
15:00				Stadium: Ninian Park; Attendance: 7,679

28 September 1999 9	Brentford	2–1	Cardiff City	London
	Andy Scott 28'; Lloyd Owusu 66'		57' John Cornforth	Stadium: Griffin Park; Attendance: 5,247

2 October 1999 10	Bury	3–2	Cardiff City	Bury
	Ian Lawson 2'; Darren Bullock 58'; Andy Preece 77'		50', 65' Kevin Nugent	Stadium: Gigg Lane; Attendance: 3,603

9 October 1999 11	Bristol Rovers	1–1	Cardiff City	Bristol
	Andy Thomson 31'		73' Danny Hill	Stadium: Memorial Stadium; Attendance: 7,363

16 October 1999 12	Cardiff City	1–1	Oldham Athletic	Cardiff
15:00	Dai Thomas 62'		17' Richard Graham	Stadium: Ninian Park; Attendance: 5,650

19 October 1999 13	Cardiff City	1–2	Stoke City	Cardiff
19:30	Andy Legg 40'		23' Peter Thorne; 58' James O'Connor	Stadium: Ninian Park; Attendance: 6,146

23 October 1999 14	Wigan Athletic	2–0	Cardiff City	Wigan
	Roberto Martinez 48'; Ian Kilford 88'			Stadium: DW Stadium; Attendance: 5,728

2 November 1999 15	Cardiff City	1–1	Blackpool	Cardiff
19:45	Kevin Nugent 89'		57' John Murphy	Stadium: Ninian Park; Attendance: 4,523

6 November 1999 16	Bournemouth	1–0	Cardiff City	Bournemouth
	Mark Stein 64'			Stadium: Dean Court; Attendance: 4,471

12 November 1999 17	Cardiff City	2–1	Chesterfield	Cardiff
19:45	Jason Bowen 10', 65'		89' Roger Willis	Stadium: Ninian Park; Attendance: 4,863; Referee: Michael Ryan (Preston)

23 November 1999 18	Colchester United	0–3	Cardiff City	Colchester
			37', 75' Ritchie Humphreys; 51' Matt Brazier	Stadium: Layer Road; Attendance: 2,557; Referee: Paul Alcock (Surrey)

27 November 1999 19	Cardiff City	1–2	Gillingham	Cardiff
15:00	Andy Legg 18'; Russell Perrett (red card) 21'	Gillingham report	1' Andy Hessenthaler; 21' Andy Thomson	Stadium: Ninian Park; Attendance: 7,608; Referee: Mark Warren (Walsall)

4 December 1999 20	Millwall	2–0	Cardiff City	Millwall
	Neil Harris 14', 28'			Stadium: The Den; Attendance: 9,044; Referee: Guy Stretton (West Bridgford)

18 December 1999 21	Burnley	2–1	Cardiff City	Burnley
15:00	Gordon Armstrong 34'; Lenny Johnrose 68'		15' (o.g.) Mitchell Thomas	Stadium: Turf Moor; Attendance: 9,753; Referee: Peter Jones (Loughborough)

26 December 1999 22	Cardiff City	1–0	Reading	Cardiff
12:15	Kevin Nugent 75'			Stadium: Ninian Park; Attendance: 9,791; Referee: Bill Jordan (Hertfordshire)

28 December 1999 23	Cambridge United	0–0	Cardiff City	Cambridge
				Stadium: Abbey Stadium; Attendance: 4,250; Referee: David Elleray

3 January 2000 24	Cardiff City	0–4	Preston North End	Cardiff
15:00			46' Robert Edwards; 55', 83' (pen.) Graham Alexander; 63' Kurt Nogan	Stadium: Ninian Park; Attendance: 10,342; Referee: Philip Joslin (Nottinghamshire)

9 January 2000 25	Bristol City	0–0	Cardiff City	Bristol
				Stadium: Ashton Gate; Attendance: 10,568; Referee: Kevin Lynch (Yorkshire)

15 January 2000 26	Cardiff City	1–1	Oxford United	Cardiff
15:00	Kevin Nugent 47'		44' Matt Murphy	Stadium: Ninian Park; Attendance: 6,914; Referee: Matt Messias (Yorkshire)

22 January 2000 27	Wrexham	2–1	Cardiff City	Wrexham
15:00	Karl Connolly 55'; Darren Ferguson 74'	Wrexham report	48' Josh Low	Stadium: The Racecourse; Attendance: 4,350; Referee: Terry Heilbron (County Durham)

30 January 2000 28	Cardiff City	1–3	Luton Town	Cardiff
12:15	Jason Bowen 89'	Luton report	22' Julian Watts; 45' Matthew Spring; 57' Liam George	Stadium: Ninian Park; Attendance: 6,185; Referee: David Crick (Worcester Park, Surrey)

5 February 2000 29	Scunthorpe United	0–0	Cardiff City	Scunthorpe
15:00				Stadium: Glanford Park; Attendance: 3,614

12 February 2000 30	Cardiff City	1–1	Brentford	Cardiff
15:00	Jason Fowler 59'		26' Martin Rowlands	Stadium: Ninian Park; Attendance: 5,478

22 February 2000 31	Cardiff City	0–0	Bristol City	Cardiff
19:45				Stadium: Ninian Park; Attendance: 6,586

26 February 2000 32	Notts County	2–1	Cardiff City	Nottingham
	Andy Hughes 80' (pen.); Alex Dyer 89'		44' Richard Carpenter	Stadium: Meadow Lane; Attendance: 5,334

3 March 2000 33	Cardiff City	2–2	Wycombe Wanderers	Cardiff
19:45	Kevin Nugent 5'; Josh Low 89'		18' Jermaine McSporran; 55' (pen.) Sean Devine	Stadium: Ninian Park; Attendance: 5,011

7 March 2000 34	Cardiff City	1–2	Bournemouth	Cardiff
19:45	Robert Earnshaw 69'		65' Mark Stein; 89' Richard Hughes	Stadium: Ninian Park; Attendance: 4,389

11 March 2000 35	Blackpool	2–2	Cardiff City	Blackpool
	Wayne Gill 1'; John Hills 12' (pen.)		18' (pen.) Kevin Nugent; 44' Jason Bowen	Stadium: Bloomfield Road; Attendance: 5,015

17 March 2000 36	Cardiff City	3–2	Colchester United	Cardiff
19:45	Jason Bowen 34', 70'; Kevin Nugent 83'		43' Jason Dozzell; 51' Lomano LuaLua	Stadium: Ninian Park; Attendance: 5,174; Referee: Mick Fletcher (Burnley)

21 March 2000 37	Chesterfield	1–1	Cardiff City	Chesterfield
	Steve Payne 32'		31' Russell Perrett	Stadium: Saltergate; Attendance: 2,348

25 March 2000 38	Reading	0–1	Cardiff City	Reading
			58' Jason Bowen	Stadium: Madejski Stadium; Attendance: 10,044; Referee: Trevor Parkes (West Midlands)

1 April 2000 39	Cardiff City	1–2	Burnley	Cardiff
15:00	Ian Cox 68' (o.g.)		21' Steve Davis; 61' Andy Payton	Stadium: Ninian Park; Attendance: 6,487; Referee: Mark Halsey (Bolton)

8 April 2000 40	Preston North End	0–0	Cardiff City	Preston
				Stadium: Deepdale; Attendance: 13,794

15 April 2000 41	Cardiff City	0–4	Cambridge United	Cardiff
15:06			20', 57' (pen.), 61' John Taylor; 86' Jonathan Hunt	Stadium: Ninian Park; Attendance: 6,592

22 April 2000 42	Oldham Athletic	1–2	Cardiff City	Oldham
	Stuart Thom 15'		44' Jason Bowen; 51' Paul Brayson	Stadium: Boundary Park; Attendance: 4,549

24 April 2000 43	Cardiff City	0–2	Bury	Cardiff
15:00			58', 90' Adrian Littlejohn	Stadium: Ninian Park; Attendance: 6,781

30 April 2000 44	Stoke City	2–1	Cardiff City	Stoke
	Arnar Gunnlaugsson 3'; James O'Connor 69'		71' Scott Young	Stadium: Britannia Stadium; Attendance: 14,192

2 May 2000 45	Gillingham	4–1	Cardiff City	Gillingham
19:45	Carl Asaba 11', 36', 59'; Nicky Southall 27'	Gillingham report	2' Jason Bowen; (red card) Andy Legg	Stadium: Priestfield Stadium; Attendance: 9,176; Referee: Scott Mathieson (Stockport)

6 May 2000 46	Cardiff City	1–0	Bristol Rovers	Cardiff
15:00	Scott Young 27'			Stadium: Ninian Park; Attendance: 6,655

=== Worthington Cup (League Cup) ===
10 August 1999 Round 1 (First leg)	Cardiff City	1–2	Queens Park Rangers	Cardiff
19:30	Jason Bowen 67'		32' Richard Langley; 65' (o.g.) Jason Fowler	Stadium: Ninian Park; Attendance: 5,702; Referee: Anthony Bates (Stoke-on-Trent)

25 August 1999 Round 1 (Second leg)	Queens Park Rangers	1–2 (a.e.t.) (3–3 agg.) (2–3 p)	Cardiff City	Q.P.R.
	Gavin Peacock 103' (pen.)		40' Matt Brazier; 115' Jamie Hughes	Stadium: Loftus Road; Attendance: 6,185

14 September 1999 Round 2 (First leg)	Cardiff City	1–1	Wimbledon	Cardiff
19:30	Kevin Nugent 23' (pen.)		73' Michael Hughes	Stadium: Ninian Park; Attendance: 7,613; Referee: Eddie Wolstenholme (Lancashire)

21 September 1999 Round 2 (Second leg)	Wimbledon	3–1 (4–2 agg.)	Cardiff City	London
	Carl Cort 52'; Robbie Earle 54', 73'		26' Jason Bowen	Stadium: Selhurst Park; Attendance: 2,272; Referee: Clive Wilkes (Oxford)

=== FA Cup ===
30 October 1999 Round 1	Leyton Orient	1–1	Cardiff City	London
	Kwame Ampadu 56'		39' (pen.) Kevin Nugent	Stadium: Brisbane Road; Attendance: 3,109; Referee: George Cain (Bootle, Merseyside)

9 November 1999 Round 1 (Replay)	Cardiff City	3–1	Leyton Orient	Cardiff
19:30	Matt Brazier 22'; Russell Perrett 51'; Kevin Nugent 54'		2' Dean Smith	Stadium: Ninian Park; Attendance: 3,095; Referee: George Cain (Bootle, Merseyside)

20 November 1999 Round 2	Bury	0–0	Cardiff City	Bury
				Stadium: Gigg Lane; Attendance: 2,603; Referee: Matt Messias (Yorkshire)

30 November 1999 Round 2 (Replay)	Cardiff City	1–0 (a.e.t.)	Bury	Cardiff
19:45	Mike Ford 120'			Stadium: Ninian Park; Attendance: 4,511; Referee: Matt Messias (Yorkshire)

21 December 1999 Round 3	Bolton Wanderers	1–0	Cardiff City	Bolton
	Eidur Gudjohnsen 29'			Stadium: Reebok Stadium; Attendance: 5,734; Referee: Graham Laws (Northumberland)

=== Auto Windscreens Shield ===
7 December 1999 Round 1	Northampton Town	1–0	Cardiff City	Northampton
19:45	Sean Parrish 69'			Stadium: Sixfields Stadium; Attendance: 2,431; Referee: Paul Taylor (Hertfordshire)

=== FAW Premier Cup ===
4 September 1999 Group B	Cardiff City	2–1	Newtown	Cardiff
14:30	Andy Legg; Jason Bowen		Nicky Ward	Stadium: Ninian Park; Attendance: 1,227

4 October 1999 Group B	Cardiff City	2–2	Barry Town	Cardiff
19:15	Danny Hill; Dai Thomas		Paul Evans; Lee Barrow	Stadium: Ninian Park; Attendance: 1,030

12 October 1999 Group B	Newtown	0–1	Cardiff City	Newtown, Powys
			Richard Carpenter	Stadium: Latham Park; Attendance: 700

26 October 1999 Group B	Barry Town	2–1	Cardiff City	Barry
	Lawrence Davies; Jodie Jenkins		Christian Roberts	Stadium: Jenner Park; Attendance: 1,007

14 December 1999 Group B	Cardiff City	3–1	Merthyr Tydfil	Cardiff
19:15	Jason Fowler; Jason Fowler; Jason Bowen		Gary Shephard	Stadium: Ninian Park; Attendance: 753

11 January 2000 Group B	Merthyr Tydfil	0–0	Cardiff City	Merthyr Tydfil
				Stadium: Penydarren Park; Attendance: 607

15 February 2000 Quarter Final	Cardiff City	4–0	Aberystwyth Town	Cardiff
19:00	Andy Legg; Mark Bonner; Russell Perrett; Kevin Nugent			Stadium: Ninian Park; Attendance: 903

11 April 2000 Semi Final (First leg)	Caernarfon Town	0–4	Cardiff City	Caernarfon
			Danny Hill; Scott Young; Jason Bowen; Kevin Nugent	Stadium: The Oval; Attendance: 648

17 April 2000 Semi Final (Second leg)	Cardiff City	4–1 (8–1 agg.)	Caernarfon Town	Cardiff
19:15	Danny Hill; Kevin Nugent; Kevin Nugent; Paul Brayson		Tommy Wingrove	Stadium: Ninian Park; Attendance: 946

14 May 2000 Final	Wrexham	2–0	Cardiff City	Wrexham
14:30	Craig Faulconbridge; Craig Faulconbridge	Wrexham report		Stadium: The Racecourse; Attendance: 3,665; Referee: Gwilym Lewis (Caersws)

== See also ==
- List of Cardiff City F.C. seasons

== Bibliography ==
- Hayes, Dean (2006). The Who's Who of Cardiff City. Breedon Books. ISBN 1-85983-462-0.
- Shepherd, Richard (2002). The Definitive Cardiff City F.C. Tony Brown. ISBN 1-899-46817-X.
- Crooks, John (1992). Cardiff City Football Club: Official History of the Bluebirds. Yore Publications. ISBN 0-9513321-8-X.
- Rollin, Glenda; Rollin, Jack, eds. (2000). Rothmans Football Yearbook 2000-2001. Headline Book Publishing. ISBN 0-7472-7232-8.
- "Football Club History Database – Cardiff City".
- Welsh Football Data Archive
