= 1998–99 Cardiff City F.C. season =

Welsh football club season

Cardiff City
1998–99 season
- Owner: Samesh Kumar
- Manager: Frank Burrows
- Football League Third Division: 3rd
- FA Cup: 4th round
- League Cup: 1st round
- FAW Premier Cup: Semi-final
- Auto Windscreens Shield: 1st round
- Top goalscorer: League: Kevin Nugent (15); All: Kevin Nugent (22)
- Highest home attendance: 12,455 (v Scunthorpe, 1 May 1999)
- Lowest home attendance: 3,742 (v Barnet, 8 September 1998)
- Average home league attendance: 7,131

The 1998–99 season was Cardiff City F.C.'s 72nd season in the Football League. They competed in the 24-team Division Three, then the fourth tier of English football, finishing third, winning promotion to Division Two.

== Players ==
Note: Flags indicate national team as defined under FIFA eligibility rules; some limited exceptions apply. Players may hold more than one non-FIFA nationality.

No.	Pos.	Nation	Player
--	GK	ENG	Jon Hallworth
--	GK	IRL	Seamus Kelly
--	DF	WAL	Mark Delaney
--	DF	ENG	Jeff Eckhardt
--	DF	ENG	Mike Ford
--	DF	WAL	Lee Jarman
--	DF	WAL	Andy Legg
--	DF	ENG	Graham Mitchell
--	DF	WAL	Lee Phillips
--	DF	WAL	Scott Young
--	MF	ENG	Chris Allen
--	MF	ENG	Mark Bonner
--	MF	WAL	Jason Bowen
--	MF	ENG	Matt Brazier

No.	Pos.	Nation	Player
--	MF	WAL	Nathan Cadette
--	MF	ENG	Richard Carpenter
--	MF	ENG	Jason Fowler
--	MF	ENG	Danny Hill
--	MF	ENG	Craig Middleton
--	MF	IRL	Wayne O'Sullivan
--	MF	ENG	Dave Penney
--	MF	WAL	Tom Ramasut
--	MF	WAL	Christian Roberts
--	FW	WAL	Robert Earnshaw
--	FW	ENG	Kevin Nugent
--	FW	ENG	Andy Saville
--	FW	WAL	Dai Thomas
--	FW	ENG	John Williams

First team squad.

== League table ==
Pos	Team	Pld	W	D	L	GF	GA	GD	Pts	Promotion or relegation
1	Brentford (C, P)	46	26	7	13	79	56	+23	85	Promotion to the Second Division
2	Cambridge United (P)	46	23	12	11	78	48	+30	81	Promotion to the Second Division
3	Cardiff City (P)	46	22	14	10	60	39	+21	80	Promotion to the Second Division
4	Scunthorpe United (O, P)	46	22	8	16	69	58	+11	74	Qualification for the Third Division play-offs
5	Rotherham United	46	20	13	13	79	61	+18	73	Qualification for the Third Division play-offs

Rules for classification: 1) Points; 2) Goals scored; 3) Goal difference
(C) Champions; (O) Play-off winners; (P) Promoted

=== Results by round ===
Round	1	2	3	4	5	6	7	8	9	10	11	12	13	14	15	16	17	18	19	20	21	22	23	24	25	26	27	28	29	30	31	32	33	34	35	36	37	38	39	40	41	42	43	44	45	46
Ground	A	H	A	H	A	H	H	A	H	A	H	A	H	H	H	A	H	A	H	A	A	H	H	A	H	A	H	H	A	A	H	A	H	A	H	A	A	H	A	H	A	A	H	A	H	A
Result	D	L	W	L	L	W	W	W	W	D	W	W	L	D	W	D	W	L	W	W	W	W	W	L	W	L	W	W	D	L	D	D	D	W	D	L	W	W	D	D	D	W	D	W	D	L
Position	~	20	10	14	18	15	13	10	6	8	5	1	5	6	5	5	3	6	3	1	1	1	1	1	1	1	1	1	1	1	1	1	1	2	2	2	2	1	1	1	2	2	2	1	2	3
Points	1	1	4	4	4	7	10	13	16	17	20	23	23	24	27	28	31	31	34	37	40	43	46	46	49	49	52	55	56	56	57	58	59	62	63	63	66	69	70	71	72	75	76	79	80	80

A = Away; H = Home; W = Win; D = Draw; L = Loss

== Fixtures and results ==
=== Third Division ===
8 August 1998 1	Hartlepool United	1–1	Cardiff City	Hartlepool
	Chris Beech 9'		52' Robert Earnshaw	Stadium: Victoria Park; Attendance: 2,591

15 August 1998 2	Cardiff City	1–3	Peterborough United	Cardiff
15:00	Andy Saville 17'		51', 68' Leon McKenzie; 55' Martin Carruthers	Stadium: Ninian Park; Attendance: 5,629

21 August 1998 3	Shrewsbury Town	0–3	Cardiff City	Shrewsbury
			8' Jeff Eckhardt; 29' Dai Thomas; 76' Kevin Nugent	Stadium: Gay Meadow; Attendance: 3,003

29 August 1998 4	Cardiff City	0–1	Rotherham United	Cardiff
15:00			63' Lee Glover	Stadium: Ninian Park; Attendance: 5,356

31 August 1998 5	Darlington	3–0	Cardiff City	Darlington
	Darren Roberts 42', 70'; Jason de Vos 75'			Stadium: Feethams; Attendance: 2,085

5 September 1998 6	Cardiff City	1–0	Plymouth Argyle	Cardiff
12:15	Paul Wotton 88' (o.g.)			Stadium: Ninian Park; Attendance: 3,939

8 September 1998 7	Cardiff City	1–0	Barnet	Cardiff
19:30	Wayne O'Sullivan 61'			Stadium: Ninian Park; Attendance: 3,742

11 September 1998 8	Halifax Town	1–2	Cardiff City	Halifax
	Kieran O'Regan 60'		80' Jason Fowler; 84' Dai Thomas	Stadium: The Shay; Attendance: 2,814

19 September 1998 9	Cardiff City	2–1	Rochdale	Cardiff
15:00	Matt Brazier 54'; Mark Bonner 58'		25' Robbie Painter	Stadium: Ninian Park; Attendance: 4,643

26 September 1998 10	Chester City	2–2	Cardiff City	Chester
	Chris Priest 64'; Rod Thomas 67'		62' Lee Jarman; 79' Matt Brazier	Stadium: Deva Stadium; Attendance: 2,842

3 October 1998 11	Cardiff City	2–0	Brighton & Hove Albion	Cardiff
15:00	Kevin Nugent 8'; John Williams 74'			Stadium: Ninian Park; Attendance: 6,143

9 October 1998 12	Hull City	1–2	Cardiff City	Hull
	David Brown 42'		10', 52' Dai Thomas	Stadium: Boothferry Park; Attendance: 8,594

17 October 1998 13	Cardiff City	0–1	Cambridge United	Cardiff
15:00			90' John Taylor	Stadium: Ninian Park; Attendance: 6,886

20 October 1998 14	Cardiff City	0–0	Leyton Orient	Cardiff
19:30				Stadium: Ninian Park; Attendance: 5,001

31 October 1998 15	Cardiff City	1–0	Exeter City	Cardiff
15:00	Craig Middleton 76'			Stadium: Ninian Park; Attendance: 5,411

7 November 1998 16	Torquay United	0–0	Cardiff City	Torquay
				Stadium: Plainmoor; Attendance: 3,342

10 November 1998 17	Cardiff City	1–0	Scarborough	Cardiff
19:30	John Williams 50'			Stadium: Ninian Park; Attendance: 4,422; Referee: Lee Cable (Woking)

22 November 1998 18	Swansea City	2–1	Cardiff City	Swansea
	Martin Thomas 69'; Matthew Bound 89'		4' John Williams	Stadium: Vetch Field; Attendance: 7,757

28 November 1998 19	Cardiff City	2–0	Southend United	Cardiff
15:00	Craig Middleton 2'; Kevin Nugent 32'			Stadium: Ninian Park; Attendance: 4,638; Referee: David Pugh (Wirral)

1 December 1998 20	Carlisle United	0–1	Cardiff City	Carlisle
			49' (pen.) Kevin Nugent	Stadium: Brunton Park; Attendance: 2,700

12 December 1998 21	Scunthorpe United	0–2	Cardiff City	Scunthorpe
			45', 54' John Williams	Stadium: Glanford Park; Attendance: 3,200

19 December 1998 22	Cardiff City	4–2	Mansfield Town	Cardiff
15:00	John Williams 12', 46'; Kevin Nugent 61', 81'		53' Steve Harper; 58' Iyseden Christie	Stadium: Ninian Park; Attendance: 9,013

26 December 1998 23	Cardiff City	3–0	Shrewsbury Town	Cardiff
12:00	John Williams 40'; Kevin Nugent 49'; Danny Hill 53'			Stadium: Ninian Park; Attendance: 12,452

28 December 1998 24	Brentford	1–0	Cardiff City	London
	Hermann Hreidarsson 53'			Stadium: Griffin Park; Attendance: 9,535

9 January 1999 25	Cardiff City	4–1	Hartlepool United	Cardiff
15:00	Wayne O'Sullivan 4'; Kevin Nugent 12'; Jeff Eckhardt 67'; Craig Middleton 88'		70' Ian Clark	Stadium: Ninian Park; Attendance: 7,766

16 January 1999 26	Peterborough United	2–1	Cardiff City	Peterborough
	Steve Castle 46'; Giuliano Grazioli 90'		25' Kevin Nugent	Stadium: London Road; Attendance: 5,890

23 January 1999 27	Cardiff City	3–2	Darlington	Cardiff
15:00	Richard Carpenter 23'; John Williams 53'; Craig Middleton 81'		1' Glenn Naylor; 87' Marco Gabbiadini	Stadium: Ninian Park; Attendance: 5,803

30 January 1999 28	Cardiff City	4–1	Brentford	Cardiff
15:00	John Williams 20'; Jeff Eckhardt 28'; Jason Fowler 52'; Kevin Nugent 76'		57' Danny Boxall	Stadium: Ninian Park; Attendance: 11,509

6 February 1999 29	Plymouth Argyle	1–1	Cardiff City	Plymouth
	Dwight Marshall 19'		63' Andy Legg	Stadium: Home Park; Attendance: 6,062

13 February 1999 30	Barnet	1–0	Cardiff City	Chipping Barnet
	Stevie Searle 70'			Stadium: Underhill Stadium; Attendance: 2,234

19 February 1999 31	Cardiff City	1–1	Halifax Town	Cardiff
19:30	Jeff Eckhardt 44'		66' Mark Bradshaw	Stadium: Ninian Park; Attendance: 8,570

27 February 1999 32	Rochdale	1–1	Cardiff City	Rochdale
	Jason Peake 44'		76' Andy Legg	Stadium: Spotland; Attendance: 2,431

5 March 1999 33	Cardiff City	0–0	Chester City	Cardiff
19:30				Stadium: Ninian Park; Attendance: 7,526

9 March 1999 34	Brighton & Hove Albion	0–2	Cardiff City	Gillingham
			16' Kevin Nugent; 31' Scott Young	Stadium: Priestfield Stadium; Attendance: 2,312

13 March 1999 35	Cardiff City	2–2	Torquay United	Cardiff
15:00	Danny Hill 36'; Jason Fowler 58'		34', 65' Tony Bedeau	Stadium: Ninian Park; Attendance: 6,956

16 March 1999 36	Rotherham United	1–0	Cardiff City	Rotherham
19:45	Chris Sedgwick 66'			Stadium: Millmoor; Attendance: 3,669; Referee: AR Hall (Birmingham)

20 March 1999 37	Exeter City	0–2	Cardiff City	Exeter
			39', 60' Kevin Nugent	Stadium: St James Park; Attendance: 3,653

27 March 1999 38	Cardiff City	2–1	Carlisle United	Cardiff
15:00	Kevin Nugent 27'; Jason Bowen 54'		22' Richard Tracey	Stadium: Ninian Park; Attendance: 7,094; Referee: Mark Cowburn (Blackpool)

3 April 1999 39	Cambridge United	0–0	Cardiff City	Cambridge
				Stadium: Abbey Stadium; Attendance: 7,787

5 April 1999 40	Cardiff City	1–1	Hull City	Cardiff
15:00	Kevin Nugent 74' (pen.)		25' Colin Alcide	Stadium: Ninian Park; Attendance: 8,252

10 April 1999 41	Leyton Orient	1–1	Cardiff City	London
	Jeff Eckhardt 49' (o.g.)		40' John Williams	Stadium: Brisbane Road; Attendance: 5,238

13 April 1999 42	Southend United	0–1	Cardiff City	Southend
			70' John Williams	Stadium: Roots Hall; Attendance: 4,076

18 April 1999 43	Cardiff City	0–0	Swansea City	Cardiff
12:00				Stadium: Ninian Park; Attendance: 10,809

24 April 1999 44	Scarborough	1–2	Cardiff City	Scarborough
	Darren Roberts 43'		24' Jeff Eckhardt; 69' Jason Bowen	Stadium: Athletic Ground; Attendance: 1,834

1 May 1999 45	Cardiff City	0–0	Scunthorpe United	Cardiff
15:00				Stadium: Ninian Park; Attendance: 12,455

8 May 1999 46	Mansfield Town	3–0	Cardiff City	Mansfield
	Tony Lormor 71'; Darrell Clarke 76' (pen.); Lee Peacock 81'			Stadium: Field Mill; Attendance: 4,032

=== Worthington Cup (League Cup) ===
11 August 1998 Round 1 (First leg)	Fulham	2–1	Cardiff City	London
	Peter Beardsley 43'; Dirk Lehmann 48'		8' John Williams	Stadium: Craven Cottage; Attendance: 4,305

18 August 1998 Round 1 (Second leg)	Cardiff City	1–2 (2–4 agg.)	Fulham	Cardiff
19:30	Jeff Eckhardt 86'		22' John Salako; 37' Simon Morgan	Stadium: Ninian Park; Attendance: 4,768

=== FA Cup ===
14 November 1998 Round 1	Cardiff City	6–0	Chester City	Cardiff
15:00	Jason Fowler 10', 40'; Craig Middleton 12'; John Williams 55', 71'; Mark Delaney 63'			Stadium: Ninian Park; Attendance: 4,220; Referee: Paul Danson (Leicester)

5 December 1998 Round 2	Cardiff City	3–1	Hednesford Town	Cardiff
15:00	Craig Middleton 45'; Jason Fowler 59'; John Williams 82'		87' Paul Carty	Stadium: Ninian Park; Attendance: 5,638

2 January 1999 Round 3	Cardiff City	1–1	Yeovil Town	Cardiff
15:00	Kevin Nugent 84'		54' Carl Dale	Stadium: Ninian Park; Attendance: 12,561

12 January 1999 Round 3 (Replay)	Yeovil Town	1–2 (a.e.t.)	Cardiff City	Yeovil
	Matt Hayfield 86'		43' Jeff Eckhardt; 91' Kevin Nugent	Stadium: Huish Park; Attendance: 8,101

27 January 1999 Round 4	Sheffield United	4–1	Cardiff City	Sheffield
	Paul Devlin 13'; David Holdsworth 52'; Lee Morris 58'; Graham Stuart 68'		19' Kevin Nugent	Stadium: Bramall Lane; Attendance: 13,296

=== Auto Windscreens Shield ===
9 December 1998 Round 1	Millwall	2–0	Cardiff City	Millwall
	Paul Shaw 26'; Neil Harris 28'			Attendance: 1,858

=== FAW Premier Cup ===
14 September 1998 Group A	Cardiff City	0–1	Bangor City	Cardiff
19:15			Darren Hilditch	Stadium: Ninian Park; Attendance: 1,100

5 October 1998 Group A	Cardiff City	2–2	Merthyr Tydfil	Cardiff
19:15	John Williams; Matt Brazier		Eston Chiverton; Cohen Griffith	Stadium: Ninian Park; Attendance: 1,191; Referee: Mark Whitby (Swansea)

26 October 1998 Group A	Bangor City	1–4	Cardiff City	Bangor
	Neil Wenham		Dai Thomas; Kevin Nugent; Kevin Nugent; Craig Middleton	Stadium: Farrar Road; Attendance: 446

17 November 1998 Group A	Merthyr Tydfil	0–0	Cardiff City	Merthyr Tydfil
				Stadium: Penydarren Park; Attendance: 945

5 January 1999 Group A	Rhyl	0–4	Cardiff City	Rhyl
			Dai Thomas; Dai Thomas; Dai Thomas; Robert Earnshaw	Stadium: Belle Vue; Attendance: 302

10 February 1999 Group A	Cardiff City	3–2	Rhyl	Cardiff
19:15	Kevin Nugent; Wayne O'Sullivan; Craig Middleton		Phil Patterson; Troy Hayder	Stadium: Ninian Park; Attendance: 832

2 March 1999 Quarter Final	Cardiff City	3–2	Swansea City	Cardiff
19:15	Dai Thomas; Jeff Eckhardt; John Williams		Julian Alsop; Ryan Casey	Stadium: Ninian Park; Attendance: 2,333

27 April 1999 Semi Final (First leg)	Wrexham	3–1	Cardiff City	Wrexham
19:15	Martyn Chalk 38'; Mark McGregor 53'; Karl Connolly 78'	Wrexham report	72' Christian Roberts	Stadium: The Racecourse; Attendance: 1,509; Referee: Brian Lawlor

10 May 1999 Semi Final (Second leg)	Cardiff City	2–1 (3–4 agg.)	Wrexham	Cardiff
19:25	Craig Middleton 5'; Kevin Nugent 89'	Wrexham report	90' Andy Morrell	Stadium: Ninian Park; Attendance: 1,212; Referee: Alan Howells (Port Talbot)

== See also ==
- List of Cardiff City F.C. seasons

== Bibliography ==
- Hayes, Dean (2006). The Who's Who of Cardiff City. Breedon Books. ISBN 1-85983-462-0.
- Shepherd, Richard (2002). The Definitive Cardiff City F.C. Tony Brown. ISBN 1-899-46817-X.
- Crooks, John (1992). Cardiff City Football Club: Official History of the Bluebirds. Yore Publications. ISBN 0-9513321-8-X.
- Rollin, Glenda; Rollin, Jack, eds. (1999). Rothmans Football Yearbook 1999-2000. Headline Book Publishing. ISBN 0-7472-7627-7.
- "Football Club History Database – Cardiff City".
- Welsh Football Data Archive
