= 1997–98 Cardiff City F.C. season =

Welsh football club season

Cardiff City
1997–98 season
- Owner: Samesh Kumar
- Manager: Kenny Hibbitt/Frank Burrows
- Football League Third Division: 21st
- FA Cup: 4th round
- League Cup: 1st round
- FAW Premier Cup: Runners-up
- Auto Windscreens Shield: 1st round
- Top goalscorer: League: Andy Saville (11); All: Andy Saville (14)
- Highest home attendance: 6,623 (v Exeter City, 26 December 1997)
- Lowest home attendance: 2,340 (v Scunthorpe, 11 November 1997)
- Average home league attendance: 3,574

The 1997–98 season was Cardiff City F.C.'s 71st season in the Football League. They competed in the 24-team Division Three, then the fourth tier of English football, finishing twenty-first.

The season also saw the launch of the FAW Premier Cup with Cardiff reaching the final before losing 2–1 to Wrexham.

== Players ==
Note: Flags indicate national team as defined under FIFA eligibility rules; some limited exceptions apply. Players may hold more than one non-FIFA nationality.

No.	Pos.	Nation	Player
--	GK	ENG	Tony Elliott
--	GK	ENG	Jon Hallworth
--	GK	AUS	Peter Zois
--	DF	ENG	Chris Beech
--	DF	ENG	Jeff Eckhardt
--	DF	ENG	Mark Harris
--	DF	WAL	Lee Jarman
--	DF	WAL	Kevin Lloyd
--	DF	SCO	Scott Paterson
--	DF	WAL	Lee Phillips
--	DF	ENG	Jimmy Rollo
--	DF	WAL	Scott Young
--	MF	WAL	Nathan Cadette
--	MF	ENG	Tony Carss
--	MF	ENG	Jason Fowler

No.	Pos.	Nation	Player
--	MF	ENG	Danny Hill
--	MF	ENG	Craig Middleton
--	MF	IRL	Wayne O'Sullivan
--	MF	ENG	Dave Penney
--	MF	WAL	Christian Roberts
--	MF	ENG	Gareth Stoker
--	FW	IRL	Glen Crowe
--	FW	WAL	Carl Dale
--	FW	WAL	Robert Earnshaw
--	FW	ENG	Chris Greenacre
--	FW	ENG	Marvin Harriott
--	FW	ENG	Kevin Nugent
--	FW	ENG	Scott Partridge
--	FW	ENG	Andy Saville
--	FW	ENG	Steve White

First team squad.

== League table ==
Pos	Team	Pld	W	D	L	GF	GA	GD	Pts
19	Darlington	46	14	12	20	56	72	−16	54
20	Swansea City	46	13	11	22	49	62	−13	50
21	Cardiff City	46	9	23	14	48	52	−4	50
22	Hull City	46	11	8	27	56	83	−27	41
23	Brighton & Hove Albion	46	6	17	23	38	66	−28	35

Rules for classification: In the Football League goals scored (GF) takes precedence over goal difference (GD).

=== Results by round ===
Round	1	2	3	4	5	6	7	8	9	10	11	12	13	14	15	16	17	18	19	20	21	22	23	24	25	26	27	28	29	30	31	32	33	34	35	36	37	38	39	40	41	42	43	44	45	46
Ground	A	A	H	H	A	H	H	A	A	H	A	A	H	H	A	H	H	H	A	H	H	A	H	A	H	A	A	A	A	H	A	H	H	H	A	A	A	H	A	H	A	H	A	H	A	H
Result	W	W	D	D	D	W	L	L	D	D	D	D	D	L	D	D	D	W	W	D	D	L	D	L	W	L	L	D	D	L	D	W	D	D	D	L	D	W	W	D	L	L	L	L	L	D
Position	~	7	11	9	10	8	10	12	13	14	17	17	16	17	18	19	18	15	14	14	15	16	16	18	15	17	17	17	17	19	20	16	17	16	18	19	19	19	17	17	19	20	21	21	21	21
Points	3	6	7	8	9	12	12	12	13	14	15	16	17	17	18	19	20	23	26	27	28	28	29	29	32	32	32	33	34	34	35	38	39	40	41	41	42	45	48	49	49	49	49	49	49	50

A = Away; H = Home; W = Win; D = Draw; L = Loss

== Fixtures and results ==
=== Third Division ===
9 August 1997 1	Leyton Orient	0–1	Cardiff City	London
			64' Carl Dale	Stadium: Brisbane Road; Attendance: 5,541

23 August 1997 2	Mansfield Town	1–2	Cardiff City	Mansfield
	John Doolan 88' (pen.)		7' Scott Partridge; 69' Chris Greenacre	Stadium: Field Mill; Attendance: 2,743

30 August 1997 3	Cardiff City	1–1	Notts County	Cardiff
15:00	Scott Young 36'		10' Steve Finnan	Stadium: Ninian Park; Attendance: 6,191

2 September 1997 4	Cardiff City	2–2	Shrewsbury Town	Cardiff
19:30	Scott Partridge 56'; Wayne O'Sullivan 79'		39' Austin Berkley; 52' Lee Steele	Stadium: Ninian Park; Attendance: 4,271

9 September 1997 5	Exeter City	1–1	Cardiff City	Exeter
	Steve Flack 90'		73' Jason Fowler	Stadium: St James Park; Attendance: 4,843

13 September 1997 6	Cardiff City	2–1	Rochdale	Cardiff
15:00	Steve White 40'; Jeff Eckhardt 87'		10' (pen.) Mark Carter	Stadium: Ninian Park; Attendance: 4,306; Referee: Mike Jones (Chester)

16 September 1997 7	Cardiff City	0–2	Chester City	Cardiff
19:30			11' Julian Alsford; 32' (pen.) Ross Davidson	Stadium: Ninian Park; Attendance: 3,949

20 September 1997 8	Lincoln City	1–0	Cardiff City	Lincoln
	Lee Thorpe 5'			Stadium: Sincil Bank; Attendance: 3,130

27 September 1997 9	Cambridge United	2–2	Cardiff City	Cambridge
	Jamie Barnwell-Edinboro 50', 79'		31' Chris Greenacre; 90' Jeff Eckhardt	Stadium: Abbey Stadium; Attendance: 2,728

4 October 1997 10	Cardiff City	1–1	Barnet	Cardiff
15:00	Jeff Eckhardt 22'		49' Ken Charlery	Stadium: Ninian Park; Attendance: 3,938

18 October 1997 11	Rotherham United	1–1	Cardiff City	Rotherham
	Steve Thompson 3' (pen.)		21' (pen.) Dave Penney	Stadium: Millmoor; Attendance: 3,197

21 October 1997 12	Darlington	0–0	Cardiff City	Darlington
				Stadium: Feethams; Attendance: 2,278

25 October 1997 13	Cardiff City	1–1	Hartlepool United	Cardiff
15:00	Glen Crowe 73'		21' Paul Baker	Stadium: Ninian Park; Attendance: 3,383

2 November 1997 14	Cardiff City	0–1	Swansea City	Cardiff
12:05			11' Keith Walker	Stadium: Ninian Park; Attendance: 6,459

4 November 1997 15	Doncaster Rovers	1–1	Cardiff City	Doncaster
	Prince Moncrieffe 54'		59' Andy Saville	Stadium: Belle Vue; Attendance: 1,004

8 November 1997 16	Cardiff City	1–1	Torquay United	Cardiff
15:00	Gareth Stoker 70'		51' Andy McFarlane	Stadium: Ninian Park; Attendance: 2,797

11 November 1997 17	Cardiff City	0–0	Scunthorpe United	Cardiff
19:30				Stadium: Ninian Park; Attendance: 2,340

18 November 1997 18	Cardiff City	2–1	Hull City	Cardiff
19:30	Andy Saville 2'; Dave Penney 19'		64' Duane Darby	Stadium: Ninian Park; Attendance: 2,504

22 November 1997 19	Brighton & Hove Albion	0–1	Cardiff City	Gillingham
15:00			20' (o.g.) Derek Allan	Stadium: Priestfield Stadium; Attendance: 2,086

29 November 1997 20	Cardiff City	1–1	Scarborough	Cardiff
15:00	Carl Dale 69'		41' Michael McElhatton	Stadium: Ninian Park; Attendance: 2,593

13 December 1997 21	Cardiff City	0–0	Peterborough United	Cardiff
15:00				Stadium: Ninian Park; Attendance: 3,401

20 December 1997 22	Macclesfield Town	1–0	Cardiff City	Macclesfield
	Steve Wood 85'			Stadium: Moss Rose; Attendance: 2,398

26 December 1997 23	Cardiff City	1–1	Exeter City	Cardiff
15:00	Carl Dale 10'		82' Neil Illman	Stadium: Ninian Park; Attendance: 6,623

28 December 1997 24	Shrewsbury Town	3–2	Cardiff City	Shrewsbury
	Mickey Brown 37'; Devon White 53'; Roger Preece 86'		69' Jason Fowler; 78' Scott Young	Stadium: Gay Meadow; Attendance: 3,238

10 January 1998 25	Cardiff City	1–0	Leyton Orient	Cardiff
15:00	Dave Penney 19' (pen.)			Stadium: Ninian Park; Attendance: 4,335

17 January 1998 26	Notts County	3–1	Cardiff City	Nottingham
	Phil Robinson 19'; Gary Jones 76', 79'		31' Mark Harris	Stadium: Meadow Lane; Attendance: 6,448

20 January 1998 27	Colchester United	2–1	Cardiff City	Colchester
	Neil Gregory 69'; Paul Buckle 79'		85' Carl Dale	Stadium: Layer Road; Attendance: 1,929; Referee: Mick Bailey (Impington)

27 January 1998 28	Chester City	0–0	Cardiff City	Chester
				Stadium: Deva Stadium; Attendance: 1,757

31 January 1998 29	Rochdale	0–0	Cardiff City	Rochdale
				Stadium: Spotland; Attendance: 1,445; Referee: Bill Burns (Scarborough)

7 February 1998 30	Cardiff City	0–1	Lincoln City	Cardiff
15:00			51' Colin Alcide	Stadium: Ninian Park; Attendance: 2,896

14 February 1998 31	Barnet	2–2	Cardiff City	Chipping Barnet
	Paul Wilson 43' (pen.); Scott McGleish 68'		16' Jason Fowler; 4' Andy Saville	Stadium: Underhill Stadium; Attendance: 2,406

17 February 1998 32	Cardiff City	4–1	Mansfield Town	Cardiff
19:30	Andy Saville 42' (pen.); Jason Fowler 46'; Tony Carss 53'; Dave Penney 78'		74' Lee Williams	Stadium: Ninian Park; Attendance: 2,451

21 February 1998 33	Cardiff City	0–0	Cambridge United	Cardiff
15:00				Stadium: Ninian Park; Attendance: 2,681

24 February 1998 34	Cardiff City	2–2	Rotherham United	Cardiff
19:30	Andy Saville 17'; Steve White 68'		11' (o.g.) Craig Middleton; 61' Lee Glover	Stadium: Ninian Park; Attendance: 2,731

28 February 1998 35	Scunthorpe United	3–3	Cardiff City	Scunthorpe
	John Eyre 14' (pen.); Jamie Forrester 32'; Alex Calvo-Garcia 86'		29', 52', 88' Andy Saville	Stadium: Glanford Park; Attendance: 2,136

3 March 1998 36	Torquay United	1–0	Cardiff City	Torquay
	Kevin Hill 45'			Stadium: Plainmoor; Attendance: 3,358

8 March 1998 37	Swansea City	1–1	Cardiff City	Swansea
	Jonathan Coates 84'		58' Jason Fowler	Stadium: Vetch Field; Attendance: 5,621

14 March 1998 38	Cardiff City	7–1	Doncaster Rovers	Cardiff
15:00	Andy Saville 27', 84'; Wayne O'Sullivan 45'; Christian Roberts 55'; Chris Beech 68'; Dave Penney 76'; Scott Young 78'		89' Adie Mike	Stadium: Ninian Park; Attendance: 2,931

21 March 1998 39	Hull City	0–1	Cardiff City	Hull
			57' Christian Roberts	Stadium: Boothferry Park; Attendance: 3,408

28 March 1998 40	Cardiff City	0–0	Brighton & Hove Albion	Cardiff
15:00				Stadium: Ninian Park; Attendance: 3,509

3 April 1998 41	Scarborough	3–1	Cardiff City	Scarborough
	Ben Worrall 8', 15'; Gary Bennett 44'		51' Andy Saville	Stadium: Athletic Ground; Attendance: 2,905

11 April 1998 42	Cardiff City	0–2	Colchester United	Cardiff
15:00			48' Paul Abrahams; 60' David Gregory	Stadium: Ninian Park; Attendance: 2,809

13 April 1998 43	Peterborough United	2–0	Cardiff City	Peterborough
	Steve Castle 48'; Niall Inman 67'			Stadium: London Road; Attendance: 4,756

18 April 1998 44	Cardiff City	1–2	Macclesfield Town	Cardiff
15:00	Christian Roberts 25'		58' Efetobore Sodje; 79' Neil Sorvel	Stadium: Ninian Park; Attendance: 2,501

27 April 1998 45	Hartlepool United	2–0	Cardiff City	Hartlepool
	Craig Midgley 3'; Denny Ingram 54' (pen.)			Stadium: Victoria Park; Attendance: 2,817

2 May 1998 46	Cardiff City	0–0	Darlington	Cardiff
15:00				Stadium: Ninian Park; Attendance: 2,610

=== Coca-Cola Cup (League Cup) ===
12 August 1997 Round 1 (First leg)	Cardiff City	1–1	Southend United	Cardiff
19:30	Jimmy Rollo 88'		40' Paul Byrne	Stadium: Ninian Park; Attendance: 2,804

26 August 1997 Round 1 (Second leg)	Southend United	3–1 (4–2 agg.)	Cardiff City	Southend
	Paul Williams 16', 18'; Mike Marsh 79'		61' Jason Fowler	Stadium: Roots Hall; Attendance: 3,002

=== FA Cup ===
15 November 1997 Round 1	Slough Town	1–1	Cardiff City	Slough
	Danny Bolt 68'		16' Wayne O'Sullivan	Attendance: 2,262

25 November 1997 Round 1 (Replay)	Cardiff City	3–2 (a.e.t.)	Slough Town	Cardiff
19:30	Carl Dale 22'; Andy Saville 55'; Steve White 114'		5' Lloyd Owusu; 74' Terry Angus	Stadium: Ninian Park; Attendance: 2,343; Referee: Dermot Gallagher (Banbury)

6 December 1997 Round 2	Cardiff City	3–1	Hendon	Cardiff
15:00	Carl Dale 20', 45'; Andy Saville 41'		86' Bashir	Stadium: Ninian Park; Attendance: 2,578; Referee: P Hunt (Cheshunt, Herts)

3 January 1998 Round 3	Cardiff City	1–0	Oldham Athletic	Cardiff
15:00	Jason Fowler 18'			Stadium: Ninian Park; Attendance: 6,808

24 January 1998 Round 4	Cardiff City	1–1	Reading	Cardiff
15:00	Kevin Nugent 47'		56' Carl Asaba	Stadium: Ninian Park; Attendance: 10,174

3 February 1998 Round 4 (Replay)	Reading	1–1 (a.e.t.) (4–2 p)	Cardiff City	Reading
19:45	Trevor Morley 56'		40' Carl Dale	Stadium: Elm Park; Attendance: 11,808; Referee: Stephen Lodge (Barnsley)

=== Auto Windscreens Shield ===
9 December 1997 Round 1	Cardiff City	0–2	Millwall	Cardiff
19:30			37' Paul Shaw; 65' Kim Grant	Stadium: Ninian Park; Attendance: 1,219

=== FAW Premier Cup ===
7 October 1997 Group B	Wrexham	0–1	Cardiff City	Wrexham
19:30		Wrexham report	74' (o.g.) Mark McGregor	Stadium: The Racecourse; Attendance: 1,181; Referee: A Howells

27 October 1997 Group B	Cardiff City	1–1	Wrexham	Cardiff
19:30	Scott Partridge 31'	Wrexham report	19' Peter Ward	Stadium: Ninian Park; Attendance: 1,383; Referee: John Ashman (Swansea)

16 December 1997 Group B	Merthyr Tydfil	0–0	Cardiff City	Merthyr Tydfil
				Stadium: Penydarren Park; Attendance: 542

23 December 1997 Group B	Newtown	1–1	Cardiff City	Newtown, Powys
19:15	Jonathan Williams		Gareth Stoker	Attendance: 415; Referee: John Collins (Swansea)

14 January 1998 Group B	Cardiff City	3–2	Newtown	Cardiff
	Steve White; Steve White; Kevin Nugent (pen.)		Scott Ruscoe; Kevin Morrison	Stadium: Ninian Park; Attendance: 951

10 February 1998 Group B	Cardiff City	1–0	Merthyr Tydfil	Cardiff
19:15	Gary Wager (o.g.)			Stadium: Ninian Park; Attendance: 1,055

17 March 1998 Quarter Final	Cardiff City	4–0	Conwy United	Cardiff
19:15	Jeff Eckhardt; Christian Roberts; Jason Fowler; Jason Fowler			Stadium: Ninian Park; Attendance: 1,328

7 April 1998 Semi Final (First leg)	Merthyr Tydfil	0–4	Cardiff City	Merthyr Tydfil
19:15			Craig Middleton; Tony Carss; Andy Saville; Carl Dale	Stadium: Penydarren Park; Attendance: 1,302; Referee: R Ellingham (Cardiff)

21 April 1998 Semi Final (Second leg)	Cardiff City	3–1 (7–1 agg.)	Merthyr Tydfil	Cardiff
19:00	Christian Roberts; Williams (o.g.); Robert Earnshaw		Ian Mitchell	Stadium: Ninian Park; Attendance: 825

17 May 1998 Final	Wrexham	2–1 (a.e.t.)	Cardiff City	Wrexham
14:30	Mark Wilson 25'; Gareth Owen 116'	Wrexham report	60' Tony Carss	Stadium: The Racecourse; Attendance: 3,700; Referee: John Ashman

== See also ==
- List of Cardiff City F.C. seasons

== Bibliography ==
- Hayes, Dean (2006). The Who's Who of Cardiff City. Breedon Books. ISBN 1-85983-462-0.
- Shepherd, Richard (2002). The Definitive Cardiff City F.C. Tony Brown. ISBN 1-899-46817-X.
- Crooks, John (1992). Cardiff City Football Club: Official History of the Bluebirds. Yore Publications. ISBN 0-9513321-8-X.
- Rollin, Glenda, ed. (1997). Rothmans Football Yearbook 1998-99. Headline Book Publishing. ISBN 0-7472-7652-8.
- "Football Club History Database – Cardiff City".
- Welsh Football Data Archive
