= 1994 Football League Trophy final =

1994 Autoglass Trophy Final
- Event: 1993–94 Football League Trophy
Huddersfield Town	Swansea City
1	1
- Swansea won 3–1 on penalties
- Date: 24 April 1994
- Venue: Wembley Stadium, London
- Referee: Jim Rushton (Stoke-on-Trent)
- Attendance: 47,773

The 1994 Autoglass Trophy Final was the 11th final of the domestic football cup competition for teams from Second Division and Third Division for the Football League Trophy. The Final was played at Wembley Stadium, London on 24 April 1994. The match was contested by Huddersfield Town and Swansea City. Swansea City won the match 3–1 on penalties after drawing 1–1 in normal and extra time.

The match was Swansea City's first ever match at Wembley. Huddersfield Town, by comparison, had played there on three previous occasions in the 1928, 1930 and 1938 FA Cup Finals and losing all three of them.

== Match details ==
24 April 1994
14:30 BST

Huddersfield Town	1–1 (a.e.t.)	Swansea City
Logan 60'	Report	McFarlane 8'
Penalties
Mitchell (penalty missed); Scully (penalty scored); Starbuck (penalty missed); Cowan (penalty missed)	1–3	(penalty scored) Cornforth; (penalty scored) Ampadu; (penalty scored) Torpey

Wembley Stadium, London
Attendance: 47,773
Referee: Jim Rushton (Stoke-on-Trent)

Huddersfield Town	Swansea City

1	Steve Francis
2	Chris Billy
3	Tom Cowan
4	Phil Starbuck
5	Pat Scully
6	Graham Mitchell
7	Richard Logan
8	Phil Robinson
9	Andy Booth
10	Darren Bullock	(substituted off) 45'
11	Simon Baldry
Substitutes:
12	Peter Jackson
13	Kevin Blackwell
14	Iain Dunn	(substituted on) 45'
Manager:
Neil Warnock

1	Roger Freestone
2	Steve Jenkins
3	Michael Basham
4	Mark Harris
5	Mark Clode	(substituted off) 68'
6	Colin Pascoe
7	John Cornforth
8	Kwame Ampadu
9	Jason Bowen
10	Andy McFarlane
11	John Hodge	(substituted off) 83'
Substitutes:
	Jon Ford	(substituted on) 68'
	Steve Torpey	(substituted on) 83'
Manager:
Frank Burrows

MATCH RULES

- 90 minutes.
- 30 minutes of extra-time if necessary.
- Penalty shoot-out if scores still level.
- Maximum of 3 substitutions.

== Road to Wembley ==
=== Huddersfield Town ===
Northern Section Group 5	Huddersfield Town	3–1	Doncaster Rovers
Northern Section Group 5	Rotherham United	1–1	Huddersfield Town
Northern Section Second Round	Huddersfield Town	0–0 (a.e.t.)	Preston North End
Huddersfield Town won 5–3 on penalties
Northern Section Quarter-finals	Huddersfield Town	3–2 (a.e.t.)	Crewe Alexandra
Northern Section Semi-final	Stockport County	0–1	Huddersfield Town
Northern Section Final 1st Leg	Huddersfield Town	4–1	Carlisle United
Northern Section Final 2nd Leg	Carlisle United	2–0	Huddersfield Town
Huddersfield Town won 4–3 on aggregate

=== Swansea City ===
Southern Section Group 2	Plymouth Argyle	1–3	Swansea City
Southern Section Group 2	Swansea City	2–0	Exeter City
Southern Section Second Round	Swansea City	2–1 (a.e.t.)	Exeter City
Southern Section Third Round	Swansea City	1–0	Port Vale
Southern Section Semi-Final	Leyton Orient	0–2	Swansea City
Southern Section Final 1st Leg	Swansea City	3–1	Wycombe Wanderers
Southern Section Final 2nd Leg	Wycombe Wanderers	1–0	Swansea City
Swansea City won 3–2 on aggregate
