= Mark Clode =

English footballer

Personal information
- Date of birth: 24 February 1973 (age 53)
- Place of birth: Plymouth, England
- Position: Full back

Senior career*
Years	Team	Apps	(Gls)
1991–1993	Plymouth Argyle	0	(0)
1993–1999	Swansea City	119	(3)
1999–2005	Bath City	?	(?)
- * Club domestic league appearances and goals

Mark Clode (born 24 February 1973) is an English former footballer who played in the Football League for Plymouth Argyle and Swansea City. Whilst at Swansea he was a part of the team that won after a penalty shootout in the 1994 Football League Trophy Final.

== Honours ==
Swansea City

- Football League Trophy: 1993–94
