= Mike Basham =

Association football player

Personal information
- Full name: Michael Basham
- Date of birth: 27 September 1973 (age 53)
- Place of birth: Barking, London, England
- Height: 6 ft 2 in (1.88 m)
- Position: Defender

Youth career
- West Ham United

Senior career*
| Years | Team | Apps | (Gls) |
| 1992–1994 | West Ham United | 0 | (0) |
| 1993 | → Colchester United (loan) | 1 | (0) |
| 1994–1995 | Swansea City | 29 | (1) |
| 1995–1997 | Peterborough United | 19 | (1) |
| 1997–2001 | Barnet | 79 | (2) |
| 2001–2003 | York City | 36 | (3) |
| 2003 | → Chelmsford City (loan) | | |
| 2003 | Chelmsford City | | |
| 2003–2004 | Thurrock | | |
- Chelmsford City
- Grays Athletic
| Total | | 164 | (7) |
- * Club domestic league appearances and goals

Michael Basham (born 27 September 1973) is an English former footballer who played as a defender in the Football League for Colchester United, Swansea City, Peterborough United, Barnet and York City. He began his career at West Ham United F.C.

== Career ==
Born in Barking, London, Basham represented England at schoolboy and youth level while on the books at West Ham United. He signed his first professional contract in July 1992, but failed to break into the first-team squad with the Hammers. Instead, he made his professional debut with Colchester United after signing on loan in 1993. Colchester manager Roy McDonough brought Basham in to help plug a leaky defence that had conceded seven goals in a defeat to Darlington days prior to his arrival.

Basham made just one appearance for Colchester, a 2–1 away defeat at Doncaster Rovers on 20 November 1993. He then returned to Upton Park to recuperate from an injury he had sustained, before he was eventually shipped out to Swansea City on the transfer deadline day in March 1994, transferring for a small fee. He went on to play a total of 45 matches for the club, and was a part of the team that won after a penalty shootout in the 1994 Football League Trophy final.

Peterborough United signed Basham in December 1995. His first appearance for the club came in the reserves as they defeated Southend United reserves 3–2, with Basham completing a full 90 minutes. After sitting on the bench as an unused substitute for a number of games, Basham made his full-debut for the Posh on 20 January 1996, a 2–1 away victory against Brighton & Hove Albion. He would go on to make 19 league appearances for the club over the next one-and-a-half seasons, playing his final Peterborough game on 11 February 1997 in a 1–0 home defeat to Wrexham after being plagued by injury.

Released by Peterborough, Basham signed for Third Division outfit Barnet in the summer of 1997. He made his debut for the club on 9 December 1997, in a 2–1 defeat to Walsall in the first round of the Football League Trophy. His first league game for Barnet came four days later when he played in a 3–1 victory against Macclesfield Town at Underhill. He became a first-team regular throughout the following months, and scored his first Barnet goal in the 2–0 win away at Doncaster Rovers on 3 March 1998. Barnet made the play-offs at the end of the campaign, but were defeated by Basham's former club Colchester United in the semi-finals. In his final season for the club, Barnet were relegated from the Football League, though Basham had already moved to York City on transfer deadline day in March 2001. He ended his time with the Bees having scored twice in 75 league appearances.

With York, Basham found himself at a club in financial turmoil, and despite playing regularly in the 2001–02 season, he found first-team appearances hard to come by in the 2002–03. He was loaned out to Chelmsford City in January 2003, and was eventually released from the club as one of the higher earners due to the financial constraints imposed by the York City Supporters Trust, who ran the club at the time. Having made 36 appearances for the Minstermen and scoring three goals, he sealed a permanent deal at Chelmsford following his release before joining Thurrock in the summer of 2003. He was then re-signed by Chelmsford in December 2004.

== Honours ==
Swansea City

- Football League Trophy: 1993–94
