= Mark Bonner =

Mark Bonner may refer to:

- Mark Bonner (footballer) (born 1974), English footballer
- Mark Bonner (football manager) (born 1985), English football head coach

== See also ==
- Mark Bonnar (born 1968), Scottish actor
