= All-Ireland Kick Fada Championship =

The All-Ireland Kick Fada Championship is an annual tournament testing the skills of Ireland's best Gaelic footballers. Fada is Irish for "long". Until 2012 the Kick Fada was sponsored by MBNA while the DAA will sponsor the event in 2013. The tournament (first played in 2000) is held annually at Bray Emmets GAA club, County Wicklow. In 2012, 19 men and 22 women competed in the competition. The competition starts at the 35 metre mark, with each contestant allowed 3 attempts to kick the ball over the bar. Each contestant can kick from their hands, off the ground or drop-kick the ball. If a contestant fails to kick the ball over the bar in the 3 attempts they are eliminated from the competition. Rounds proceed with the successful contestant from the previous round kicking with the distance increased by a further 5 metres. Whoever can score a point from the furthest distance is the winner. There are separate competitions for men and women.

The Kick Fada record, which stands at 75 metres, was achieved by four time champion Damien Sheridan from Longford. Suzanne Hughes from Ballyboden St Endas GAA Club holds the all time female record of 52m from back in 2001.

As part of the Kick Fada, famous GAA stars and legends of the past are inducted into the "Hall of Fame"

== Roll of honour ==
=== Men ===
Year	Winner	Club	County	Winning kick
2016	Fintan Ruddy	Cill Chomáin	Mayo	
2015	Fintan Ruddy	Cill Chomáin	Mayo	
2014	Damien Sheridan	Dromard	Longford	75m
2013	Damien Sheridan	Dromard	Longford	75m
2012	Damien Sheridan	Dromard	Longford	65m
2011	Shane Duffy	Magheracloone Mitchells	Monaghan	60m
2010	Damien Sheridan	Dromard	Longford	65m
2009	Brian Sheridan	Seneschalstown	Meath	71m
2008	Paul Hearty	Crossmaglen	Armagh	70m
2007	John Brennan	O'Hanrahans	Carlow	67m
2006	Fintan Ruddy	Cill Chomáin	Mayo	62m
2005	Pádraig Kelly	Shamrocks	Offaly	63m
2004	Pádraig Kelly	Shamrocks	Offaly	70m
2003	Mark Herbert	Ballyteague	Kildare	59m
2002	Mark Herbert	Ballyteague	Kildare	61m
2001	Mark Herbert	Ballyteague	Kildare	72m
2000	Mark Herbert	Ballyteague	Kildare	63m

=== Women ===
Year	Winner	Club	County	Winning kick
2016	Serena Hannon	Clanna Gael Fontenoy	Dublin	
2015	Serena Hannon	Clanna Gael Fontenoy	Dublin	
2014	Serena Hannon	Clanna Gael Fontenoy	Dublin	48m
2013	Serena Hannon	Clanna Gael Fontenoy	Dublin	51m
2012	Serena Hannon	Clanna Gael Fontenoy	Dublin	45m
2011	Irene Munnelly	Wolfe Tones	Meath	37m
2010	Mary Sheridan	Seneschalstown	Meath	45m
2009	Suzanne Hughes	Ballyboden St. Enda's	Dublin	48m
2008	Mary Sheridan	Seneschalstown	Meath	43m
2007	Irene Munnelly	Wolfe Tones	Meath	45m
2006	Gillian Bennett	Seneschalstown	Meath	48m
2005	Irene Munnelly	Wolfe Tones	Meath	45m
2004	Gráinne Nulty	Seneschalstown	Meath	45m
2003	Mary Sheridan	Seneschalstown	Meath	40m
2002	Vourneen Quigley	Kilkerley Emmets	Monaghan	43m
2001	Suzanne Hughes	Ballyboden St. Enda's	Dublin	52m
2000	Ann McGillycuddy	An Tóchar	Wicklow	40m

=== Hall of Fame ===
Year	Inductee	County team
2012	Mickey Whelan	Dublin
2011	Brian McEniff	Donegal
2010	Billy Morgan	Cork
2009	Frank McGuigan	Tyrone
2008	Paddy Doherty	Down
2007	Mick O'Dwyer	Kerry
2006	Jimmy Keaveney	Dublin
2005	Dermot Early	Roscommon
2004	Donie O'Sullivan	Kerry
2003	Peter Nolan	Offaly

=== Masters ===
Year	Winner	County	Winning kick
2003	Damien Sheridan	Meath	49m
2002	Martin McHugh	Donegal	54m
2001	Keith Barr	Dublin	62m
2000	Pat Spillane	Kerry	51m

== Rules ==
- The competition is open to all current GAA members over the age of 18.
- The object of the event is to find the longest yet most accurate kickers of a standard GAA football.
- The winner of the competition will be the contestant with the longest successful kick.
- A successful kick is deemed to be one where the ball crosses over the bar and between the posts prior to touching the ground.
- The ball used will be standard Size 5 for men and Size 4 for ladies.
- Each kick will be taken from a pre-determined marked distance from the target.
- The kick may be taken from the hand or from the ground.
- Players may use a tee if they so wish.
- The taking of a kick by each remaining contestant as a specific distance will be called a 'round'.
- There will be a maximum of three rounds per distance.
- Once a contestant has achieved a successful kick they will be deemed to have qualified for the next round and will not be required to take a further kick at the current distance.
- Each contestant will take a kick in turn until all remaining members of the group have completed an attempt at the current distance.
- After a maximum of three rounds at a particular distance the distance will be increased by a pre-determined number of metres and a new round will begin for all successful kickers.
- If a contestant fails to make any successful kick at a particular distance they will not go forward to the next round.
- In the event of no contestant achieving a successful kick in a round, there will be a sudden-death playoff of all contestants who qualified for that round.
- The winners of the competition will have the choice of continuing within the rules, to establish the longest successful kick and attempt to set a new record.
- The decision of the Kica Fada Event Co-ordinator will be final in the event of a dispute.
