= Jon Ford (footballer) =

English footballer

Personal information
- Full name: Jonathan Ford
- Date of birth: 12 April 1968 (age 58)
- Place of birth: Stourbridge, England
- Position: Defender

Team information
- Current team: Stourbridge

Senior career*
Years	Team	Apps	(Gls)
–1991	Cradley Town		
1991–1995	Swansea City	160	(7)
1995–1996	Bradford City	19	(0)
1996–1997	Gillingham	4	(0)
1997–1999	Barnet	47	(2)
1999	Kidderminster Harriers		
1999–2000	Telford United	32	(3)
2000–2001	Halesowen Town		
2001–2003	Bromsgrove Rovers		
2003–2005	Stourbridge		
- * Club domestic league appearances and goals

Jonathan Ford (born 12 April 1968) is an English former professional footballer who played as a defender. Ford made over 200 appearances in the Football League between 1991 and 1999.

== Career ==
=== Playing career ===
Born in Stourbridge, Ford began his career in non-league football with Cradley Town. He then played in the Football League for Swansea City, Bradford City, Gillingham and Barnet, before returning to non-league football with Kidderminster Harriers, Telford United, Halesowen Town, Bromsgrove Rovers and Stourbridge. Whilst at Swansea he was a part of the team that won after a penalty shootout in the 1994 Football League Trophy Final.

=== Coaching career ===
After retiring as a player, Ford became a football coach.

He is the Assistant Manager at Stourbridge.

== Honours ==
Swansea City

- Football League Trophy: 1993–94
