= Chris Beech =

Chris Beech is the name of:

- Chris Beech (footballer, born 1974), English football player and coach
- Chris Beech (footballer, born 1975), English football player
