= Shane Duffy (Gaelic footballer) =

Monaghan Gaelic footballer

Shane Duffy is a Gaelic footballer who plays for the Ratoath club and, previously, at senior level for the Monaghan county team for over a decade. He was a very important figure in Magheracloone Mitchell's capture of the Monaghan Senior Football Championship in 2004, Ratoath's capture of the Meath and Leinster Intermediate Championship titles in 2015, and in Monaghan's 2005 National Football League Division 2 title.

As well as winning a Senior title in his native Monaghan, Duffy has also claimed 3 Senior titles in his adopted Meath making him the only person to have Senior Championship Medals in both Counties.

Duffy is an experienced goalkeeper, with a trademark long kick, who held off competition from players such as Glen Murphy.

Duffy won the 2011 All-Ireland Kick Fada Championship with a 64-metre kick into a strong headwind.
