= Jason Bowen (footballer) =

Welsh footballer (born 1972)

Personal information
- Full name: Jason Peter Bowen
- Date of birth: 24 August 1972 (age 54)
- Place of birth: Merthyr Tydfil, Wales
- Height: 5 ft 7 in (1.70 m)
- Positions: Forward; winger

Senior career*
Years	Team	Apps	(Gls)
1990–1995	Swansea City	124	(26)
1995–1997	Birmingham City	48	(7)
1997	→ Southampton (loan)	3	(0)
1997–1999	Reading	15	(1)
1999–2004	Cardiff City	134	(34)
2004–2008	Newport County	149	(48)
2008–2013	Llanelli	115	(13)
Total		588	(129)

International career
1992–1993	Wales U21	5	(1)
1994–1996	Wales	2	(0)
- * Club domestic league appearances and goals

Jason Peter Bowen (born 24 August 1972) is a Welsh former international footballer. During his career, he made over 500 league appearances and was capped twice by Wales in a career which started at Swansea City. He made over 100 league appearances for the club and played in their 1994 Football League Trophy final victory over Huddersfield Town. In 1995, he was sold to Birmingham City for £350,000.

== Playing career ==
Born and raised in Merthyr Tydfil, Bowen began his career at Swansea City, making his debut in the 1990–91 season under manager Terry Yorath, having signed professional forms in July 1990. In his five seasons at The Vetch he played 124 league games, scoring 26 goals, mostly under the management of Frank Burrows and captaincy of John Cornforth and helped the club to victory in the 1994 Football League Trophy final, defeating Huddersfield Town on penalties. He also finished as the club's top goalscorer during the 1993–94 season, scoring 17 times in all competitions. Whilst at Swansea, he progressed from the Welsh schools and youth set-ups through to the full international squad, earning his first full cap from Mike Smith in a 2–1 win in Estonia in May 1994.

In July 1995, he then moved to Birmingham City for a fee of £350,000, where he remained for a further three years. He won his second Welsh cap in a 7–1 defeat in the Netherlands in 1996. He had a spell on loan at Southampton in September 1997 under manager Dave Jones, and made three appearances in the Premiership. It seemed that the move would be made permanent but the clubs were unable to agree a fee, so Bowen returned to Birmingham.

He then moved to Reading in December 1997 for a fee of £200,000, but he and four other players, including Welsh international teammate Andy Legg, fell out with manager Tommy Burns. The group were dubbed the "gang of five" and were forced to train away from the rest of the first team with the youth side. He returned to Wales in January 1999 where he spent five years with Cardiff City, reuniting with his former Swansea manager Frank Burrows, suffering one relegation but offsetting that with three promotions as Cardiff took off following the arrival of Sam Hammam. He was put on the transfer list by Cardiff in March 2004 and left the club by mutual consent the following month, having made just two league appearances for the "Bluebirds" during the 2003–04 season.

In July 2004 he joined Newport County, making his debut on 14 August 2004 at Havant & Waterlooville. He left Newport in the summer of 2008 and signed for Llanelli. Bowen also played for Cardiff City in the 2008 Screwfix Western Masters tournament, and was named player of the tournament.

== Personal life ==
Bowen has three sons, including footballer Sam. Jaye played for the Cardiff City under-18 squad before being released, while Sam was previously with the first-team side and made his debut in 2021.

On 9 February 2023, it was announced that Bowen has been diagnosed with motor neurone disease.

== Honours ==
Swansea City

- Football League Trophy: 1993–94

Cardiff City

- Football League Second Division play-offs: 2003
- Football League Third Division promotion: 1998–99, 2000–01
- FAW Premier Cup: 2002
