= Mark Delaney (footballer) =

Welsh footballer

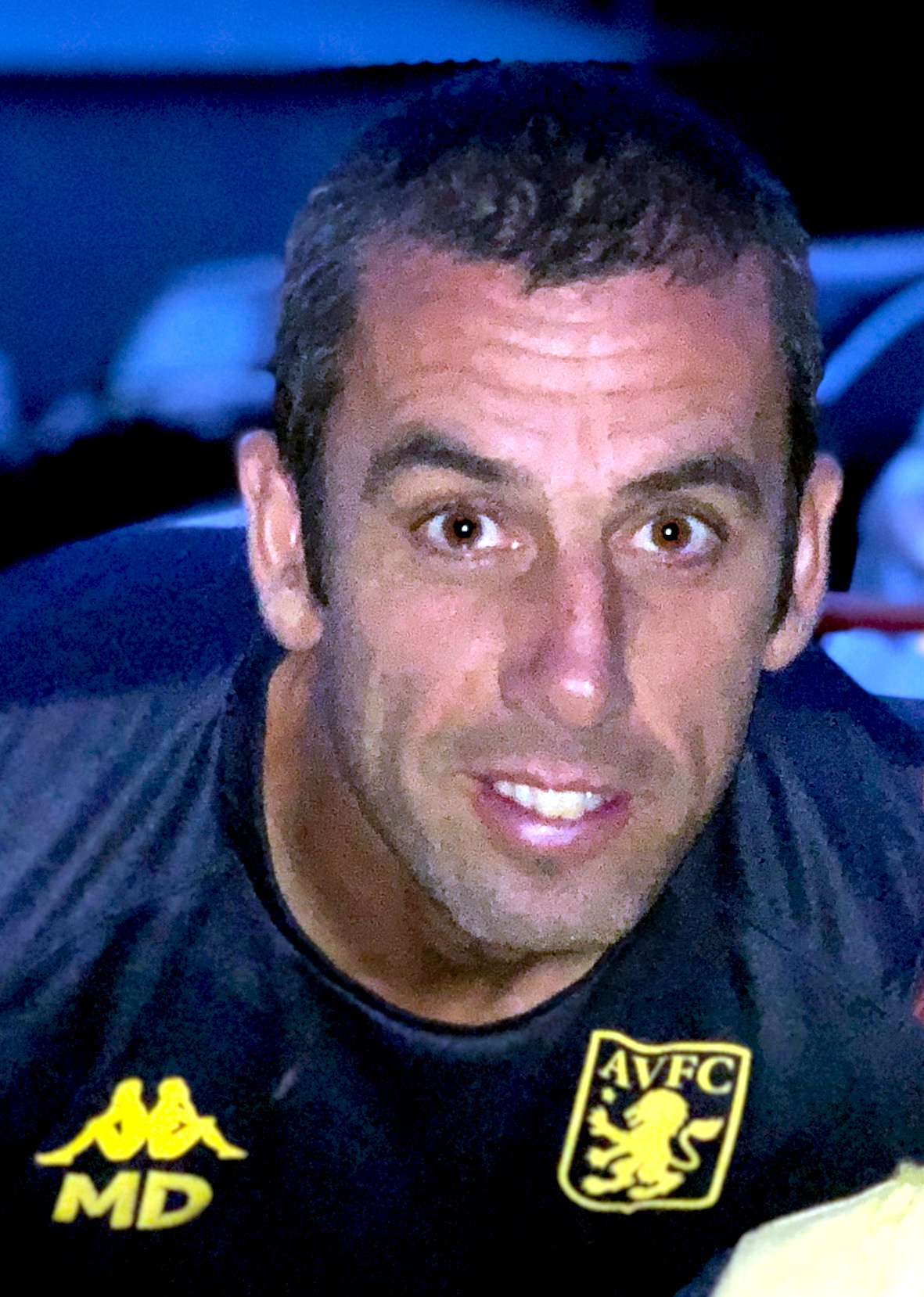
- Delaney in 2019

Personal information
- Full name: Mark Anthony Delaney
- Date of birth: 13 May 1976 (age 50)
- Place of birth: Haverfordwest, Wales
- Position: Right-back

Youth career
- ????–1994: Manchester United

Senior career*
Years	Team	Apps	(Gls)
1995–1998	Carmarthen Town	58	(3)
1998–1999	Cardiff City	28	(0)
1999–2007	Aston Villa	158	(2)
Total		244	(5)

International career
1999–2006	Wales	36	(0)

Managerial career
- 2008–2022: Aston Villa (academy coach)
- 2021: Aston Villa (stand-in)
- 2023–2026: Coventry City (academy)
- 2024: Coventry City (first-team coach)
- * Club domestic league appearances and goals

Mark Anthony Delaney (born 13 May 1976) is a Welsh former professional footballer. He played for Carmarthen Town, Cardiff City and Aston Villa as a right-back. He is also a former member of the Wales national team, gaining 36 caps during his career. In doing so, he became the first player to progress from the Cymru Premier to the senior national side.

== Early life ==
Mark Anthony Delaney was born on 13 May 1976. Delaney was raised in Goodwick, Pembrokeshire by his parents Mike and Angelina. He is of Italian descent, with his maternal grandparents having moved to Wales after World War II. He attended Ysgol Bro Gwaun (located in Fishguard). He is a fluent Welsh speaker.

== Club career ==
=== Carmarthen Town and Cardiff City ===
As a youngster, Delaney played in the youth system at Manchester United but was released after he was deemed too small. After playing for local amateur side Goodwick United, Delaney joined League of Wales side Carmarthen Town in 1996, later becoming club captain at 20 years of age. He was spotted by Cardiff City manager Frank Burrows and joined the club on 1 June 1998 on a free transfer. He made 40 appearances in all competitions for Cardiff, scoring once in the FA Cup against Chester City on 14 November 1998, between his purchase and his sale to Aston Villa eight months later on 9 March 1999 for £500,000. Delaney had been travelling to an away match with Cardiff against Brighton & Hove Albion when he was informed of the transfer by manager Frank Burrows on their arrival.

=== Aston Villa ===
The day after his transfer was completed, Delaney's father drove him to Birmingham and he travelled with the first-team for their match against Derby County. One month later, Delaney was handed his Premier League debut by manager John Gregory, replacing Steve Stone in the final ten minutes of a 3–1 victory over Nottingham Forest on 24 April 1999. He made just one further appearance for the club during the final matches of the 1998–99 season, during a 1–0 defeat to Arsenal. After a full pre-season with Villa, Gregory promoted Delaney to first choice right-back ahead of Steve Watson at the start of the following season. Delaney credits Gregory with improving his performances during his early career with Villa, Gregory singling out Delaney during his seventh appearance for the side, describing him as "playing like a tart" during the half-time team talk. Delaney went on to score the only goal of the game in the second half of the match as his side defeated Watford 1–0.

During his first season at Villa Park, the club finished in sixth place in the league, reached the semi-final of the League Cup and the final of the FA Cup, Delaney playing the full match as Villa lost 1–0 to Chelsea. He made 193 first appearances for Aston Villa in all competitions, with two goals coming against Watford on 24 August 1999 and Everton on 26 December 2005. He has also gained 36 international caps with the Wales national team.

Delaney's Aston Villa career was tempered with knee injuries, which he attributes to his willingness to fly into tackles as a youngster hoping to impress. Delaney travelled to see noted American knee specialist Richard Steadman in an attempt to end the injuries, but was informed by the surgeon that it was unlikely that Delaney would return to playing football following extensive surgery. Delaney was out of contract at Aston Villa in summer 2007 and was hoping to impress Martin O'Neill enough to win a new contract. However, on 15 August 2007, he announced his retirement from football due to his injury problems.

== Coaching career ==
On 5 September 2007, Delaney stated he was hoping to go into coaching, and in 2008, Delaney re-joined Aston Villa as a youth coach. In 2015, Delaney was named head coach of the Aston Villa F.C. Under-23s squad.

On 8 January 2021, Aston Villa were forced to name a squad full of academy players for an FA Cup third round tie against Liverpool due to a COVID-19 outbreak at Villa's Bodymoor Heath Training Ground. First team coach Dean Smith was unable to attend as he had to self-isolate, so Delaney acted as first team coach for that game. Aston Villa lost the game 4–1, but were praised for the performance of their young, inexperienced side.

On 20 May 2022, it was announced that Delaney had left Aston Villa, after 14 years at the club in various coaching roles.

On 7 September 2023, Delaney was appointed lead professional development phase coach at Coventry City, who will take charge of the under 18s. On 9 August 2024, Delaney was appointed a first-team coach at the club along with under 21s coach John Dempster. On 30 November 2024, Delaney was appointed the club's new senior professional development phase coach taking charge of the under-21s. On 9 July 2026, Coventry City announced that Delaney left the club.

== Career statistics ==
Appearances and goals by club, season and competition
Club	Season	League			FA Cup		League Cup		Other (Note: Includes Welsh Cup and the UEFA Intertoto Cup.)		Total	
Club	Season	Division	Apps	Goals	Apps	Goals	Apps	Goals	Apps	Goals	Apps	Goals
Carmarthen Town	1996–97	League of Wales	24	2	0	0	0	0	0	0	24	2
Carmarthen Town	1997–98	League of Wales	34	1	0	0	0	0	0	0	34	1
Carmarthen Town	Total		58	3	0	0	0	0	0	0	58	3
Cardiff City	1998–99	Third Division	28	0	5	1	2	0	5	0	40	1
Aston Villa	1998–99	Premier League	2	0	0	0	0	0	0	0	2	0
Aston Villa	1999–2000	Premier League	28	1	5	0	3	0	0	0	36	1
Aston Villa	2000–01	Premier League	19	0	0	0	1	0	1	0	21	0
Aston Villa	2001–02	Premier League	30	0	0	0	1	0	8	0	39	0
Aston Villa	2002–03	Premier League	12	0	0	0	1	0	4	0	17	0
Aston Villa	2003–04	Premier League	25	0	0	0	5	0	0	0	30	0
Aston Villa	2004–05	Premier League	30	0	1	0	1	0	0	0	32	0
Aston Villa	2005–06	Premier League	12	1	3	0	1	0	0	0	16	1
Aston Villa	2006–07	Premier League	0	0	0	0	0	0	0	0	0	0
Aston Villa	Total		158	2	9	0	13	0	13	0	193	2
Career total			244	5	14	1	15	0	18	0	291	6

== Honours ==
Aston Villa

- UEFA Intertoto Cup: 2001
- FA Cup runner-up: 1999–2000

Individual

- PFA Team of the Year: 1998–99 Third Division
