= Phil Patterson =

New Zealand footballer

Personal information
- Full name: Philip Patterson
- Date of birth: June 1973 (age 53)
- Place of birth: Lower Hutt, New Zealand
- Height: 1.80 m (5 ft 11 in)
- Position: Midfielder

Team information
- Current team: Upper Hutt City AFC
- Number: 7

International career
Years	Team	Apps	(Gls)
1997	New Zealand	1	(0)

Philip Patterson also known as Phil Patterson is an association football player who represented New Zealand at international level.

Patterson, who played for Hutt Valley as a junior provincial representative, is the longest serving senior club player in the Wellington region at the top flight, having played for Lower Hutt City AFC first team for over 20 years, with more than 430 caps at the top level. He also played for Wellington United in the now defunct "New Zealand Summer League", several Wellington representative teams and Keith F.C. in the Highland Football League in Scotland.

Patterson made a solitary official international appearance for New Zealand in a 0–5 loss to Indonesia on 21 September 1997.
