= Jamie Hughes (footballer) =

English footballer

Personal information
- Full name: Jamie Joseph Hughes
- Date of birth: 5 April 1977 (age 49)
- Place of birth: Liverpool, England
- Position: Striker

Senior career*
Years	Team	Apps	(Gls)
1995–1996	Tranmere Rovers	0	(0)
1997	Rhyl	2	(0)
1997–1999	Connah's Quay Nomads	62	(37)
1999–2000	Cardiff City	2	(1)
2000	→ Cwmbran Town (loan)	13	(4)
2000	Bangor City	7	(5)
2000–2001	Connah's Quay Nomads	10	(2)
2001–2003	Derry City	50	(9)
- Vauxhall Motors
2004	Northwich Victoria	7	(2)
2004–2005	Lancaster City		
2005	Airbus UK	6	(3)
2005	Connah's Quay Nomads	2	(0)
- * Club domestic league appearances and goals

Jamie Joseph Hughes (born 5 April 1977) is an English former professional footballer who is notable for becoming the first British footballer to fail a test for a performance-enhancing drug. While a YTS player with Division One Tranmere Rovers in May 1995, he failed a drugs test and was discovered to have taken amphetamines. His punishment for the offence was a six-month ban from football (suspended for two years).

Hughes has since played at non-league level for clubs including Vauxhall Motors, Lancaster City and Ashton United. He also played for Rhyl, Bangor City and Connah's Quay Nomads in the League of Wales and Derry City in the League of Ireland.
