= Prince Moncrieffe =

English footballer

Personal information
- Date of birth: 27 February 1977 (age 48)
- Place of birth: Jamaica
- Position: Forward

Senior career*
Years	Team	Apps	(Gls)
–1997	Hyde United		
1997–1998	Doncaster Rovers	40	(10)
1998–1999	Hyde United		
1999–????	Winsford United		
- * Club domestic league appearances and goals

Prince Moncrieffe (born 27 February 1977) is a Jamaican retired footballer, who played as a striker.

== Career ==
He first played for Hyde United. He replaced last season's top scorer Tony Carroll and was remarked for a "dazzling, scoring display" in October 1996.

In 1997, Moncrieffe signed for Doncaster Rovers in the Football League Third Division. Despite Doncaster losing 34 league games, the most for any English club in a season, he wound up as the team's top scorer with ten league goals.

After his season with Doncaster Rovers he rejoined Hyde United. In 1999 he signed for Winsford United.
