= Mark Bonner (footballer) =

English footballer (born 1974)

Personal information
- Full name: Mark Bonner
- Date of birth: 7 June 1974 (age 52)
- Place of birth: Ormskirk, England
- Height: 5 ft 10 in (1.78 m)
- Position: Midfielder

Youth career
- 1989–1991: Blackpool

Senior career*
Years	Team	Apps	(Gls)
1991–1998	Blackpool	178	(14)
1998–2004	Cardiff City	143	(2)
1999	→ Hull City (loan)	1	(1)
2004–2006	Oldham Athletic	33	(1)
Total		355	(18)
- * Club domestic league appearances and goals

Mark Bonner (born 7 June 1974) is an English former professional footballer who played as a midfielder. During his career, he made over 300 appearances in the Football League. He began his professional career with Blackpool, making his first-team debut at the age of 17, and went on to make over 200 appearances for the side in all competitions. In 1998, he turned down a new contract at Bloomfield Road and instead joined Cardiff City, where he spent six seasons. In 1999, he spent a brief period on loan at Hull City to regain match fitness after struggling for playing time at Ninian Park, playing one match before returning to Cardiff due to injury.

During his spell with the Bluebirds, Bonner helped the club to three promotions in six seasons and suffered one relegation during the 1999–2000 season. The club reached the First Division in his time there, and he also played in their 2–1 victory over Premier League side Leeds United in the third round of the FA Cup in January 2002. In 2004, Bonner joined Oldham Athletic but suffered a career-ending injury in September 2005 after breaking his arm in a match against Port Vale. After two surgeries on the arm, he was advised to stop playing by medical staff and retired from professional football in 2006 at the age of 32.

== Early life ==
Bonner was born in Ormskirk in Lancashire. As a teenager, he attended Bishop Rawstorne Church of England Academy in Croston.

== Career ==
=== Blackpool ===
Bonner began his career playing youth football for local side Euxton Villa. A boyhood Blackpool fan, he joined the club on a Youth Training Scheme (YTS) deal at the age of 15 after impressing scout Neil Bailey, before progressing through the youth ranks under Jimmy Mullen and Graham Carr. He broke into the first team as a teenager, making his debut at the age of 17 in November 1991 as a substitute during a 5–2 victory over Aldershot. However, this match was later expunged from the final standings after Aldershot withdrew from the Football League due to bankruptcy. His official debut then came just four days later when he was named in the starting line-up in a 1–1 draw with Chesterfield. He went on to make three league appearances during the 1991–92 season as Blackpool reached the Division Four play-off final, defeating Scunthorpe United on penalties to win promotion to the Third Division, although Bonner played no part in the play-offs. At the end of the season, he signed his first professional contract on 18 June 2002.

At the age of 19, he became a regular in the first team under Billy Ayre during the manager's final two years with the Tangerines. During the 1995–96 season, Blackpool missed out on promotion to the Second Division by a single point under the guidance of manager Sam Allardyce. During the play-offs, they played Bradford City, with Bonner scoring once during a 2–0 first leg win. However, Bradford won the second leg 3–0 to advance to the final. He also played in several notable FA Cup upsets at the club, including defeating Manchester City, a game in which he was tasked with marking Georgian winger Georgi Kinkladze, and a 5–4 defeat to Chelsea, after Blackpool had recovered from an original 2–0 first leg deficit by scoring three times at Stamford Bridge.

=== Cardiff City ===
After seven years and four managers in his time at Bloomfield Road, Bonner moved south to join Cardiff City in 1998 on a free transfer after turning down a new contract at Blackpool, stating "I felt I was going a bit stale and I needed a new challenge. It was nothing to do with Blackpool or the people connected with the club, I just felt it was time to move on." Another reason Bonner chose Cardiff was the presence of his former Blackpool manager Billy Ayre at Ninian Park, describing him as "almost like a second dad to me", where he was assistant manager to Frank Burrows. Ayre would later replace Burrows as manager during the 1999–2000 season as the club struggled. He soon established himself in the side but after suffering from injury he was unable to reclaim his place and was allowed to join Third Division side Hull City on a one-month loan deal, alongside Blackpool midfielder Gary Brabin. In debut for the club, he scored the winning goal against Rotherham United, but the loan spell was cut short when he suffered an ankle injury in training and was sent back to Cardiff, with the Rotherham game being his only appearance for the club.

After recovering from the injury, he managed to force his way back into the side that had seen an injection of funds from chairman Sam Hammam that saw a number of new signings arrive, including Graham Kavanagh, Spencer Prior and Neil Alexander. Bonner played a key role in the club's promotion to Division Two, forming a central midfield partnership with Willie Boland, stating that the pair did the "donkey work" to allow the rest of the team to focus on attacking. Having come close to leaving the side in March 2003 after falling out of favour under manager Lennie Lawrence, Bonner commented "I got my head down, trained hard and have forced myself back into the side". He also revealed that he had considered handing in a transfer request to Lawrence several weeks prior.

During his time at Ninian Park, Bonner played key roles in avoiding relegation back to the Third Division and the eventual promotion to the First Division, helping the club to three promotions during his six-season stay and suffering one relegation during the 1999–2000 season. He also played in the 2003 Football League Second Division play-off final at the Millennium Stadium as a late substitute in place of Andy Legg as Cardiff defeated Queens Park Rangers 1–0 to win promotion. He was also part of the side that caused a FA Cup upset by defeating Premier League leaders Leeds United in the third round during the 2001–02 season.

During the 2003–04 season, Bonner made 20 appearances for the Bluebirds but fell out of favour at the club, making his final appearance in December 2003 as injuries decreased his playing time. He grew unhappy after he and teammate Gareth Whalley were excluded from the side due to a potential contractual bonus being triggered if either of the pair played another league fixture for the club. He left the club in March 2004 after being released. Prior to his release he commented, "It's disappointing to go, but things have gone a bit stale and it's time to move on for the good of my football future."

=== Oldham Athletic ===
Bonner joined Division Two side Oldham Athletic in March 2004 on a deal until the end of the 2003–04 season, becoming Brian Talbot's first signing since being appointed manager. After criticising Cardiff for not triggering the £50,000 bonus payment for matches played, he was rebuffed by Lawrence who commented "I have never heard such nonsense in my life. (He) had a two-year contract shortly after I took over, a deal extraordinarily generous in both length and terms." Bonner had been recommended to Talbot by Lawrence and Cardiff had paid Bonner a £30,000 tax free lump sum to move as Oldham were unable to afford his full wages.

He made nine appearances during the final two months of the season as Oldham avoided relegation and he was rewarded with a two-year contract with the Latics. He scored once for Oldham against Southend United.

On 28 September 2005, having just signed a new contract extension at the club, Bonner played in a 2–2 draw with Port Vale but suffered a severely broken arm in the opening five minutes of the match after colliding with a Port Vale player. He was quickly replaced by Richard Butcher, before being transported to a local hospital for treatment. His arm was pinned back together and he was originally expected to be out for eight weeks. However, his arm failed to knit back together correctly and, in November, this was eventually extended to an estimated three months out. He was forced to undergo a second operation where surgeons were able to graft bone from his hip onto his arm, which was eventually secured using a metal plate and nine pins. He was forced to retire from football at the age of 32 on medical advice after being warned of potential permanent disability if he injured the arm again.

== Personal life ==
After his retirement from football, he opened a furniture store in Chorley.

== Career statistics ==
=== Club ===
Club	Season	League			FA Cup		League Cup		Other (Note: Includes other competitive competitions, including the Football League Trophy and Football League play-offs)		Total	
Club	Season	Division	Apps	Goals	Apps	Goals	Apps	Goals	Apps	Goals	Apps	Goals
Blackpool	1991–92	Fourth Division	3	0	0	0	0	0	1	0	4	0
Blackpool	1992–93 (Note: The Third Division was renamed the Second Division following the creation of the Premier League)	Second Division	15	0	2	0	2	0	2	0	21	0
Blackpool	1993–94	Second Division	40	7	1	0	6	0	2	0	49	7
Blackpool	1994–95	Second Division	17	0	0	0	0	0	1	0	18	0
Blackpool	1995–96	Second Division	42	3	3	0	2	0	5	1	52	4
Blackpool	1996–97	Second Division	29	1	2	0	4	0	1	0	36	1
Blackpool	1997–98	Second Division	32	3	2	0	4	0	1	0	39	3
Blackpool	Total		178	14	10	0	18	0	13	1	219	15
Cardiff City	1998–99	Third Division	25	1	0	0	2	0	1	0	28	1
Cardiff City	1999–2000	Second Division	31	0	2	0	2	0	0	0	35	0
Cardiff City	2000–01	Third Division	24	1	2	0	2	0	0	0	28	1
Cardiff City	2001–02	Second Division	29	0	4	0	0	0	4	1	37	1
Cardiff City	2002–03	Second Division	14	0	0	0	0	0	5	0	19	0
Cardiff City	2003–04	First Division	20	0	0	0	2	0	0	0	22	0
Cardiff City	Total		143	2	8	0	8	0	11	1	170	3
Hull City (loan)	1998–99	Third Division	1	1	0	0	1	0	0	0	1	1
Oldham Athletic	2003–04	Second Division	7	0	0	0	0	0	0	0	7	0
Oldham Athletic	2004–05	League One	19	0	0	0	1	0	0	0	20	0
Oldham Athletic	2005–06	League One	7	1	0	0	1	0	0	0	8	1
Oldham Athletic	Total		33	1	0	0	2	0	0	0	35	1
Total			355	18	18	0	29	0	24	2	426	20

== Honours ==
Cardiff City

- Football League Second Division play-offs: 2003
- Football League Third Division promotion: 1998–99, 2000–01
