= Stevie Searle =

English footballer

Personal information
- Date of birth: 7 March 1977 (age 49)
- Place of birth: Lambeth, London, England
- Height: 5 ft 10 in (1.78 m)
- Position: Midfielder

Senior career*
Years	Team	Apps	(Gls)
1996–1997	Sittingbourne	?	(?)
1997–2002	Barnet	88	(4)
2000	→ Stevenage Borough (loan)	5	(0)
2002	Woking	0	(0)
2002	Welling United	4	(0)
2002	Fisher Athletic	?	(?)
2002–2004	Tonbridge Angels	26	(1)
2004–2006	Chatham Town	?	(?)
2006–2007	Sittingbourne	?	(?)
Total		118	(5)
- * Club domestic league appearances and goals

Stevie Searle (born 7 March 1977) in Lambeth, London, England, is an English retired professional footballer who played as a midfielder for Barnet in the Football League.
