= Seamus Kelly (footballer) =

Irish Gaelic footballer

Séamus Kelly
Personal information
- Full name: Séamus Kelly
- Date of birth: 6 May 1974 (age 52)
- Place of birth: Tullamore, Ireland
- Position: Goalkeeper

Youth career
- –1993: Tullamore Town

Senior career*
Years	Team	Apps	(Gls)
1993–1998	UCD	150	(0)
1998–2000	Cardiff City	13	(0)
2000–2003	St Patrick's Athletic		
2003–2005	Bohemians		
2005	→ Longford Town (loan)		
2006–2008	Longford Town		

International career
- Republic of Ireland B
- * Club domestic league appearances and goals

Seamus Kelly (born 6 May 1974) is an Irish former footballer who played as a goalkeeper.

His brother Pádraic played as a keeper for Offaly for many years. Seamus also played as a goalkeeper for Offaly minor team in 1992.

== Career ==
Séamus Kelly signed for UCD from his hometown club, Tullamore Town, in the summer of 1993. Kelly made his League of Ireland debut on 19 September 1993. In the 1996–97 season, he was capped at international level by the Republic of Ireland B team. He made 150 appearances for UCD and established himself as one of the league's best keepers before joining Cardiff City in 1998 as cover for Jon Hallworth. Kelly began his Cardiff career on the bench but was called upon at the end of the 1998–99 season when Hallworth broke two ribs in a match against Leyton Orient. He played in the final five matches of the season, making his debut in a 1–0 win over Southend United, helping the club clinch promotion to Division Two. The following season saw the same scenario at the opposite end of the table as Kelly played in the final six matches of the year but was unable to help the club to avoid relegation, and was released at the end of the season.

Kelly returned to Dublin to sign for St Patrick's Athletic in 2000. After 3 seasons in Inchicore, Stephen Kenny took him to Bohemians where he challenged for the starting spot with Matt Gregg. Kelly was first choice during Bohemians' UEFA Champions League campaign in 2003 but never made the goalkeeping spot his own during his time at Dalymount Park. Kelly joined Longford Town from Bohs in 2005 and played a crucial role in the club's FAI Cup run in 2007 and also their gallant battle against relegation that same season. Following a mass exodus of players at the end of that season, Kelly remained on as one of only three players for the 2008 season (the others being Daire Doyle and Alan O'Riordan) as then manager Aaron Callaghan attempted to assemble a squad almost from scratch. Due to persistent back problems, Kelly retired during the summer of 2008.

In 2010, he became a goalkeeping coach at Shelbourne. As of 2025, Kelly lectures in UCD.

== Honours ==
UCD

- Leinster Senior Cup (2): 1994–95, 1995–96
