= Andy McFarlane =

English footballer

Personal information
- Full name: Andrew Antonie McFarlane
- Date of birth: 30 November 1966 (age 59)
- Place of birth: Wolverhampton, England
- Height: 6 ft 3 in (1.91 m)
- Position: Forward

Senior career*
Years	Team	Apps	(Gls)
- Cradley Town
1990–1992	Portsmouth	2	(0)
1992–1995	Swansea City	55	(8)
1995–1997	Scunthorpe United	60	(19)
1997–1999	Torquay United	57	(13)
- * Club domestic league appearances and goals

Andrew Antonie McFarlane (born 30 November 1966) is an English retired footballer who played as a striker. Whilst at Swansea he was a part of the team that won after a penalty shootout in the 1994 Football League Trophy Final.

== Honours ==
Swansea City

- Football League Trophy: 1993–94
