= Pádraic Kelly =

Offaly Gaelic football goalkeeper

Personal information
- Native name: Pádraic Ó Ceallaigh (Irish)
- Born: 1975 or 1976 (age 50–51) Tullamore, Ireland
- Height: 1.85 m (6 ft 1 in)

Sport
- Sport: Gaelic football
- Position: Goalkeeper
Club
- Years: Club
- Shamrocks
Inter-county
- Years: County
- 1994–2009: Offaly
Inter-county titles
- Leinster titles: 1
- NFL: 1

Pádraic Kelly (born 1970s) is an Irish former Gaelic football goalkeeper who played for the Offaly senior team.

== Biography ==
Kelly played senior inter-county football for Offaly between 1994 and 2009, and with his club Shamrocks. He was part of the Offaly team that won the 1997 Leinster SFC title and the National Football League in 1998.

His brother Séamus was also a keeper for UCD, Cardiff City, St Patrick's Athletic and Longford Town.
