= Kwame Ampadu =

Irish footballer (born 1970)

Personal information
- Full name: Patrick Kwame Ampadu
- Date of birth: 20 December 1970 (age 55)
- Place of birth: Bradford, England
- Height: 5 ft 10 in (1.78 m)
- Position: Midfielder

Youth career
- Sherrard United
- Belvedere

Senior career*
Years	Team	Apps	(Gls)
1988–1991	Arsenal	2	(0)
1990	→ Plymouth Argyle (loan)	6	(1)
1991–1994	West Bromwich Albion	49	(4)
1994–1998	Swansea City	144	(12)
1998–2000	Leyton Orient	72	(1)
2000–2005	Exeter City	162	(1)
2005	Newport County	8	(0)
2005–2006	Tiverton Town	30	(0)
Total		473	(19)

International career
1989–1992	Republic of Ireland U21	4	(0)

Managerial career
- 2008–2012: Exeter City U18
- 2012–2016: Arsenal Youth
- 2016–2018: Arsenal U18
- 2018–2020: Monaco (assistant)
- 2020–2022: CF Montréal (assistant)
- 2023–2025: Columbus Crew (assistant)
- 2025–2026: Celtic (assistant)
- * Club domestic league appearances and goals

Patrick Kwame Ampadu (born 20 December 1970) is an Irish football coach and former player who was last an assistant manager for Celtic under Wilfried Nancy. He previously was an assistant coach for Monaco. A midfielder, Ampadu featured for clubs Arsenal, Swansea City, Leyton Orient and Exeter City in his playing career. He also played for the Republic of Ireland U21 national team.

== Early life ==
Ampadu was born in Bradford, West Yorkshire, England, to an Irish mother and Ghanaian father. Ampadu subsequently moved with his parents to Dublin, Ireland, where he was raised. He undertook his primary and secondary education at O'Connell's School in Dublin where his schoolmates included future footballer Jeff Kenna. At a young age he took up the sport of hurling but thereafter found himself to be quite proficient at football as well.

== Playing career ==
Ampadu first played in Irish youth football for Sherrard United and Belvedere before joining Arsenal in July 1988. His debut came in a 3–1 win away to Derby County on 24 March 1990. He went on to have loan spells at Plymouth Argyle and West Bromwich Albion the following season, before making a permanent move to the latter in June 1991.

Ampadu spent three years at West Bromwich Albion before moving to Swansea City in February 1994. He played in Swansea City's 1994 Football League Trophy win at Wembley. He also reached the 1997 Football League Third Division play-off final with the Swans. He moved to Leyton Orient in May 1998 making 72 league appearances in two seasons but missing the Third Division play-offs in 1998–99 through injury. He then had a spell at Exeter City where he scored twice against Swindon Town in the League Cup and Dagenham & Redbridge in the league. In January 2005 he played in Exeter's memorable 0–0 draw at Old Trafford in the FA Cup. Ampadu then had stints with Newport County and Tiverton Town where his playing days eventually came to an end in 2006.

== Managerial career ==
Ampadu returned to Exeter to be a part of the club's coaching outfit. He took up the role in July 2008 within the club's academy, to be at the helm of the Grecians Under 18 side. He moved to Arsenal in 2012 to become the Under 14s coach at the London side's Hale End Academy.

== Personal life ==
Ampadu's son Ethan is a footballer who plays for Leeds United and Wales. The younger Ampadu, at the age of 15 years and 10 months, made his debut for Exeter City in a League Cup tie against Brentford on 9 August 2016, breaking an 87-year-old record set by Cliff Bastin.

== Honours ==
=== Player ===
Swansea City

- Football League Trophy: 1993–94

=== Managerial ===
Arsenal

- U18 Premier League runner-up: 2016–17
