= John Cornforth (footballer) =

Welsh footballer and manager

Personal information
- Full name: John Michael Cornforth
- Date of birth: 7 October 1967 (age 59)
- Place of birth: Whitley Bay, England
- Height: 6 ft 1 in (1.85 m)
- Position: Midfielder

Senior career*
Years	Team	Apps	(Gls)
1985–1991	Sunderland	32	(2)
1986	→ Doncaster Rovers (loan)	7	(3)
1989	→ Shrewsbury Town (loan)	3	(0)
1990	→ Lincoln City (loan)	9	(1)
1991–1996	Swansea City	149	(16)
1996	Birmingham City	8	(0)
1996–1999	Wycombe Wanderers	47	(6)
1998	→ Peterborough United (loan)	4	(0)
1999	Cardiff City	10	(1)
1999–2000	Scunthorpe United	4	(1)
2000–2001	Exeter City	24	(2)

International career
1995	Wales	2	(0)

Managerial career
- 2001–2002: Exeter City
- 2004–2005: Newport County
- 2006: Torquay United
- * Club domestic league appearances and goals

John Michael Cornforth (born 7 October 1967) is a former Wales international football player and is now a coach. Originally from Whitley Bay in the north-east of England, Cornforth and his family have been settled in Devon for some time.

Cornforth is currently assistant manager at Northern Premier side Blyth Spartans.

== Playing career ==
Cornforth usually appeared in midfield during his playing days. He made a total of 322 starts for his various clubs over his career, scoring 36 goals in the process. Whilst at Swansea City he was a part of the team that won after a penalty shootout in the 1994 Football League Trophy Final. At one point he commanded a transfer fee of £350,000, in his 1996 transfer from Swansea to Birmingham City. His four and a half years and nearly 200 games for Swansea led him to declare himself "a true Jack".

== International career ==
Cornforth was eligible to play for the Wales national football team due to his paternal grandmother, who was from Llantrisant. He had two caps before a cruciate ligament injury interrupted his career.

== Coaching career ==
Cornforth was player-coach, assistant manager and manager of Exeter City.

In July 2004 he joined the coaching team (unpaid) at his local side Crediton United.

In September 2004 he took over from Peter Nicholas as manager of Newport County but was sacked in 2005.

In January 2006 Cornforth took over as caretaker manager at Torquay United from Leroy Rosenior with the side deep in relegation trouble; soon afterwards, he was appointed as manager until the end of the season. The side's form worsened however, and Ian Atkins replaced Cornforth in April, having joined the club as an advisor to Cornforth the previous month. Against all odds, Atkins managed to rescue the side and lift them a comfortable three points clear from relegation.

In August 2007, Cornforth rejoined his local side Crediton United as an advisor. The following month he was reported to be combining this role with working as a milk tanker driver, while hoping for a return to football management at a higher level.

In November 2010 Cornforth was appointed Manager of South West Peninsula League side Witheridge.

In February 2012 Cornforth joined Blyth Spartans F.C. as Assistant manager to Tom Wade.

In February 2013 Cornforth joined Horden CW as a coach.

In June 2016 Cornforth returned as assistant manager of Blyth Spartans.

== Honours ==
Sunderland

- Football League Third Division: 1987–88

Swansea City

- Football League Trophy: 1993–94

Individual

- PFA Team of the Year: 1994–95 Second Division
