= Dai Thomas (footballer, born 1975) =

Welsh footballer

Personal information
- Full name: David John Thomas
- Date of birth: 26 September 1975 (age 51)
- Place of birth: Caerphilly, Wales
- Position: Forward

Senior career*
| Years | Team | Apps | (Gls) |
| 1994–1997 | Swansea City | 56 | (10) |
| 1997–1998 | Watford | 16 | (3) |
| 1998–2000 | Cardiff City | 31 | (5) |
| 2000 | → Drogheda United (loan) | 4 | (1) |
- Merthyr Tydfil
- Bryntirion Athletic
| 2001–2002 | Llanbradach | | |
- * Club domestic league appearances and goals

David John "Dai" Thomas (born 26 September 1975) is a Welsh former professional footballer and Wales under-21 international. His professional career came to an end in 2000 when he was filmed mixing with football hooligans in Belgium during Euro 2000.

== Career ==
Born in Caerphilly, Thomas began his career at Swansea City, where his prolific goalscoring record in the club's reserve side saw him handed his league debut at the end of the 1994–95 season against Plymouth Argyle. Following his debut, he was unable to hold down a regular first team spot and was offered a move away from the club but instead chose to remain at Vetch Field and attempt to force his way into the side. The following season, Thomas managed to make more of an impact on the first team, scoring ten times during the season, which persuaded Watford to pay £100,000 to sign him.

He spent a single season at Watford, scoring three times in twenty appearances. At the end of the 1997–98 season he returned to Wales to sign for Cardiff City in a deal worth £50,000. He scored four times during his first season at Ninian Park and pledged to improve his fitness during the off-season but only managed one goal during the next year, in a 1–1 draw with Oldham Athletic in October 1999, after appearing in just eight games.

In January 2000, Thomas signed on loan for Drogheda United for the remainder of the 1999–2000 League of Ireland season. He made his League of Ireland debut at home to Shamrock Rovers on 30 January. In 4 league appearances he netted once at Galway United on 13 February.

Following his release from Cardiff, Thomas joined Merthyr Tydfil, before moving onto Bryntirion Athletic. In January 2002, following his appearance at Cardiff Magistrates' Court for hooliganism, Thomas was released from South Wales Amateur League side Llanbradach.

=== Arrests ===
In June 2000, the BBC's current affairs programme Panorama aired pictures of violent clashes with Belgian police during Euro 2000, which included footage showing Thomas involved with a group accused of fighting running battles with police and chanting racist taunts. Thomas denied any involvement with the group stating that he had simply "been caught up in a sweep" by police and had not been arrested or deported, however Belgian police argued that he had been both arrested and deported. After the incident, Thomas was suspended by Cardiff City until an FAW inquiry was completed. Following a formal disciplinary hearing, Thomas was fined the maximum amount allowed by the club which was believed to be two weeks wages, but was not charged with any criminal offence. He remained with Cardiff for a further three months until he was released from his contract with the club in October 2000.

In 2002, Thomas was jailed following his involvement in a pitch invasion after a 2–1 FA Cup win for Cardiff at Ninian Park over Leeds United. At the end of the match supporters ran onto the pitch and were held back from away fans by riot police. Police footage showed Thomas throwing an advertising hoarding towards away fans. He pleaded guilty to one count of threatening and violent behaviour and was sentenced to sixty days in jail as well as a ban from all football grounds in England and Wales for six years.

== Honours ==
Watford

- Football League Second Division: 1997–98
