= Jason Fowler (footballer) =

English footballer (born 1974)

Personal information
- Full name: Jason Kenneth George Fowler
- Date of birth: 20 August 1974 (age 52)
- Place of birth: Bristol, England
- Height: 6 ft 3 in (1.91 m)
- Position: Midfielder

Team information
- Current team: Cardiff City (Youth Coach)

Youth career
- Bristol City

Senior career*
Years	Team	Apps	(Gls)
1992–1996	Bristol City	25	(0)
1996–2001	Cardiff City	144	(15)
2001–2005	Torquay United	97	(7)
Total		266	(22)
- * Club domestic league appearances and goals

Jason Kenneth George Fowler (born 20 August 1974) is an English former professional footballer. During his career, he made over 250 appearances in the Football League in spells with Bristol City, Cardiff City and Torquay United.

== Career ==
Having featured for both Southampton and Oxford United as a schoolboy, Fowler signed for his hometown club Bristol City at the age of 16, making his debut during a 2–1 defeat to Reggiana in the Anglo-Italian Cup on 8 December 1992. However, he struggled to establish himself in the first team and was eventually released in 1996.

He was signed by Cardiff City and quickly became a regular in the squad, helping the side to promotion from Division Three in the 1998–99 season. He was diagnosed with an over-active thyroid during the 2000–01 season and struggled to keep his place in the squad due to the illness. He left Cardiff in 2001 for a fresh start at Torquay United where he spent four years before being forced into retirement in 2005 due to the discovery of Arthritis in his hips.

== Post-retirement ==
In September 2006, Fowler began working as an assistant coach with the Cardiff City F.C. Academy under 16's team, along with James McCarthy.

== Honours ==
Individual

- PFA Team of the Year: 1998–99 Third Division
