= Jeff Eckhardt =

English footballer

Personal information
- Full name: Jeffrey Edward Eckhardt
- Date of birth: 7 October 1965 (age 61)
- Place of birth: Sheffield, England
- Height: 6 ft 0 in (1.83 m)
- Position: Defender

Youth career
- 1981–1984: Sheffield United

Senior career*
Years	Team	Apps	(Gls)
1984–1987	Sheffield United	74	(2)
1987–1994	Fulham	249	(25)
1994–1996	Stockport County	62	(7)
1996–2001	Cardiff City	138	(14)
2001–2004	Newport County	118	(15)
2004–2006	Merthyr Tydfil	?	(?)
2005	→ Newport County (loan)	4	(0)
2006	Gloucester City	6	(0)

Managerial career
- 2006: Merthyr Tydfil (co-manager)
- 2007–2009: Risca United
- * Club domestic league appearances and goals

Jeffrey Edward Eckhardt (born 7 October 1965) is an English former professional footballer. A centre-half, he was highly regarded by fans both for his commitment and footballing skills.

== Club career ==
Born in Sheffield, Eckhardt grew up supporting his hometown side Sheffield United and later joined the youth system at the club as a teenager. After a number of reserve team players were required to travel with the first-team, Eckhardt was handed an opportunity to play for the reserves against Coventry City, during which he impressed enough to be offered a two-year deal by manager Martin Peters. During the 1985–86 season, he was roommates with Ray Lewington who promised Eckhardt that when he became a manager he would sign him for his team, fulfilling the promise two years later when Lewington took charge of Fulham. Although he turned down Lewington's initial approach in 1986 as he was playing regularly for the first-team, he later accepted the move in November 1987 after being dropped, joining for a fee of £50,000.

He made his debut for Fulham on 21 November 1987 in a 2–0 victory over Rotherham United. After joining the club as a centre-back, Eckhardt gradually adapted to several different positions and became known for his versatility, playing as both a midfielder and a forward during his time at Craven Cottage. He went on to make over 250 appearances for Fulham in all competitions, during a six-year spell at the club and was appointed club captain. At the end of the 1993–94 season, the team suffered relegation to the Third Division and Eckhardt decided to accept an offer from Stockport County manager Danny Bergara. During his time at Stockport, he won promotion to the First Division. He scored his only career hat-trick for the club during a match against Lincoln City, a game in which he also played in goal after an injury to their goalkeeper.

He moved to South Wales where he signed for Cardiff City in 1996 for £30,000, scoring the only goal in a 1–0 victory over Brighton & Hove Albion on his debut. He spent five years at Cardiff before moving to Newport County. He remained there for three years but was released in June 2004 despite finishing as the club's joint top goalscorer, winning the player of the season award and helping the club win promotion to the Conference South, with Eclhardt describing the club's decision as "disappointing". He joined Merthyr Tydfil. During the 2005 season he re-joined Newport on a short loan deal after the club appealed to any available players who would play for the club due to an injury crisis. He left Merthyr in 2006 and spent a brief spell with Gloucester City. He joined Risca as player-manager and at that point in his career Eckhardt had made over 800 appearances in all competitions for his various clubs.

== Managerial career ==
In 2006, he briefly took over as co-manager of Merthyr Tydfil along with Paul Evans for a period of six weeks before resuming as a player. In January 2007, he was appointed player-manager of Risca United.
