= Kevin Nugent (footballer) =

English footballer

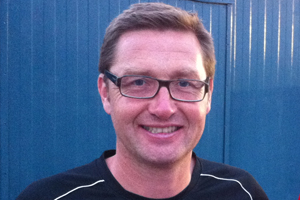
- Nugent in 2013

Personal information
- Full name: Kevin Patrick Nugent
- Date of birth: 10 April 1969 (age 57)
- Place of birth: Edmonton, England
- Height: 6 ft 1 in (1.85 m)
- Position: Striker

Team information
- Current team: Millwall U23 (manager)

Senior career*
Years	Team	Apps	(Gls)
1985–1992	Leyton Orient	94	(20)
1989	→ Cork City (loan)		
1992–1995	Plymouth Argyle	131	(32)
1995–1997	Bristol City	69	(14)
1997–2002	Cardiff City	99	(29)
2002–2003	Leyton Orient	28	(4)
2003	→ Swansea City (loan)	4	(3)
2003–2006	Swansea City	70	(13)
Total		495	(115)

Managerial career
- 2007: Swansea City (caretaker)
- 2009: Leyton Orient (caretaker)
- 2010: Leyton Orient (caretaker)
- 2014: Leyton Orient
- 2016: Charlton Athletic (caretaker)
- 2017: Barnet
- * Club domestic league appearances and goals

Kevin Patrick Nugent (born 10 April 1969) is an English professional football manager and former player. He is the manager of the Millwall U23 team.

== Playing career ==
Nugent began his career at Leyton Orient in the 1980s and made over 100 appearances in all competitions for the club, spending time on loan at Cork City during the 1988–89 season. After finishing the 1991–92 season as the club's top scorer, he signed for Plymouth Argyle in March 1992 for a transfer fee of £200,000 and made over 100 appearances for Plymouth. In September 1995, he moved to Bristol City for a fee of £75,000, although first-team opportunities were more limited.

Nugent signed for Cardiff City in June 1997 for a transfer fee of £65,000. After an injury hit first year at Ninian Park, Nugent enjoyed a strong second year, being awarded the club's player of the year award. He also later captained the side before an Achilles injury saw him lose his place in the side and later leave on a free transfer in January 2002 to return to Leyton Orient, where his career had begun.

In January 2003, Nugent signed for Swansea City on loan, making the move permanent a month later. He was released by the club's new manager Kenny Jackett in June 2004 but a week later, he was surprisingly re-signed as a player and also appointed assistant manager.

Including his appearances on loan, to the end of the 2005–06 season, Nugent had played 83 games for Swansea City in all competitions and had scored 19 goals. He retained his player registration, allowing him to play during injury crises, although he played only once during the 2005–06 season.

Kevin is an ex-pupil of Saint Ignatius College, Enfield.

== Management career ==
Nugent started his coaching career as assistant manager to Kenny Jackett at Swansea City. When Jackett was sacked on 15 February 2007, Nugent became caretaker manager for two matches earning just one point. With Roberto Martínez taking over, and wanting to bring his own men in, Nugent's future was unclear until Martinez offered him the position of chief scout.

In June 2007, Nugent returned to his playing roots and became the Leyton Orient youth team manager. When Orient manager Martin Ling and his assistant Dean Smith were sacked on 18 January 2009, Nugent took over as caretaker manager. In his four games in charge, he won once; a shock victory at promotion chasing Milton Keynes Dons. Soon after Geraint Williams was installed as Leyton Orient's new manager, with Nugent retaining his role as assistant manager. On 3 April 2010, Williams was sacked and Nugent was once again installed as caretaker manager, remaining in charge for a 2–1 defeat to Southampton before returning to his role as assistant manager following the appointment of Russell Slade. On 25 September 2014, Nugent took over as caretaker manager once more, after Slade resigned a day earlier. He was then named interim manager on 16 October, before Mauro Milanese took over as manager on 27 October. Nugent returned to a coaching role at Orient before leaving the club on 22 January 2016.

On 29 January 2016, Nugent was appointed as first-team coach at Luton Town.

After six months with Luton, Nugent joined Charlton Athletic on 19 July as their assistant manager. He was named caretaker manager on 17 November, following the departure of manager Russell Slade, and won his first match in charge two days later, a 2–0 victory at home to Port Vale. Nugent's stint in caretaker charge concluded on 28 November, during which Charlton won twice and drew once under his tenure, with Karl Robinson taking over as manager.

Nugent was appointed head coach at League Two club Barnet on 15 February 2017. He parted company with Barnet on 15 April, after only winning one of 11 matches during his two months in charge. Nugent was appointed manager of the under-23 team at Millwall in August 2017.

== Managerial statistics ==
As of match played 14 April 2017

Managerial record by team and tenure
Team	From	To	Record					Ref
Team	From	To	P	W	D	L	Win %	Ref
Swansea City (caretaker)	15 February 2007	25 February 2007	3	0	1	2	0.0	
Leyton Orient (caretaker)	18 January 2009	5 February 2009	4	1	1	2	25.0	
Leyton Orient (caretaker)	3 April 2010	5 April 2010	1	0	0	1	0.0	
Leyton Orient (interim)	25 September 2014	27 October 2014	7	2	2	3	28.6	
Charlton Athletic (caretaker)	17 November 2016	28 November 2016	3	2	1	0	66.7	
Barnet	15 February 2017	15 April 2017	11	1	4	6	9.1	
Total			29	6	9	14	20.7	—
