= 1993–94 Football League Trophy =

Autoglass Trophy

Tournament details
- Country: England; Wales

The 1993–94 Football League Trophy, known as the 1993–94 Autoglass Trophy, was the 13th staging of the Football League Trophy, a knock-out competition for English football clubs in the Second Division and the Third Division. The winners were Swansea City and the runners-up were Huddersfield Town.

The competition began on 27 September 1993 and ended with the final on 24 April 1994 at Wembley Stadium.

In the first round, there were two sections split into seven groups: North and South. In the following rounds each section gradually eliminates teams in knock-out fashion until each has a winning finalist. At this point, the two winning finalists face each other in the combined final for the honour of the trophy.

== First round ==
=== Northern Section ===
Bradford City and Rochdale received byes to second round

Group 1
Team	Pld	W	D	L	GF	GA	GD	Pts
York City	2	2	0	0	3	0	+3	6
Darlington	2	0	1	1	1	2	−1	1
Hartlepool United	2	0	1	1	1	3	−2	1

Date	Team 1	Score	Team 2
28 Sep	Hartlepool United	1–1	Darlington
19 Oct	Darlington	0–1	York City
9 Nov	York City	2–0	Hartlepool United

Group 2
Team	Pld	W	D	L	GF	GA	GD	Pts
Scunthorpe United	2	1	1	0	6	3	+3	4
Scarborough	2	1	1	0	4	2	+2	4
Hull City	2	0	0	2	1	6	−5	0

Date	Team 1	Score	Team 2
27 Sep	Scarborough	2–2	Scunthorpe United
19 Oct	Scunthorpe United	4–1	Hull City
9 Nov	Hull City	0–2	Scarborough

Group 3
Team	Pld	W	D	L	GF	GA	GD	Pts
Preston North End	2	2	0	0	4	2	+2	6
Carlisle United	2	1	0	1	3	3	0	3
Burnley	2	0	0	2	2	4	−2	0

Date	Team 1	Score	Team 2
28 Sep	Carlisle United	1–2	Preston North End
19 Oct	Preston North End	2–1	Burnley
9 Nov	Burnley	1–2	Carlisle United

Group 4
Team	Pld	W	D	L	GF	GA	GD	Pts
Chester City	2	1	1	0	4	3	+1	4
Crewe Alexandra	2	0	2	0	4	4	0	2
Blackpool	2	0	1	1	3	4	−1	1

Date	Team 1	Score	Team 2
28 Sep	Blackpool	1–2	Chester City
19 Oct	Chester City	2–2	Crewe Alexandra
16 Nov	Crewe Alexandra	2–2	Blackpool

Group 5
Team	Pld	W	D	L	GF	GA	GD	Pts
Lincoln City	2	2	0	0	3	1	+2	6
Mansfield Town	2	1	0	1	3	2	+1	3
Chesterfield	2	0	0	2	2	5	−3	0

Date	Team 1	Score	Team 2
28 Sep	Lincoln City	1–0	Mansfield Town
19 Oct	Mansfield Town	3–1	Chesterfield
9 Nov	Chesterfield	1–2	Lincoln City

Group 6
Team	Pld	W	D	L	GF	GA	GD	Pts
Huddersfield Town	2	1	1	0	4	2	+2	4
Rotherham United	2	1	1	0	3	2	+1	4
Doncaster Rovers	2	0	0	2	2	5	−3	0

Date	Team 1	Score	Team 2
28 Sep	Huddersfield Town	3–1	Doncaster Rovers
18 Oct	Doncaster Rovers	1–2	Rotherham United
9 Nov	Rotherham United	1–1	Huddersfield Town

Group 7
Team	Pld	W	D	L	GF	GA	GD	Pts
Stockport County	2	2	0	0	5	1	+4	6
Bury	2	1	0	1	4	4	0	3
Wigan Athletic	2	0	0	2	1	5	−4	0

Date	Team 1	Score	Team 2
28 Sep	Stockport County	2–0	Wigan Athletic
19 Oct	Wigan Athletic	1–3	Bury
9 Nov	Bury	1–3	Stockport County

=== Southern Section ===
Leyton Orient and Bournemouth received byes to second round.

Group 1
Team	Pld	W	D	L	GF	GA	GD	Pts
Wrexham	2	1	1	0	3	1	+2	4
Port Vale	2	0	2	0	2	2	0	2
Shrewsbury Town	2	0	1	1	3	5	−2	1

Date	Team 1	Score	Team 2
28 Sep	Wrexham	3–1	Shrewsbury Town
19 Oct	Shrewsbury Town	2–2	Port Vale
9 Nov	Port Vale	0–0	Wrexham

Group 2
Team	Pld	W	D	L	GF	GA	GD	Pts
Swansea City	2	2	0	0	5	1	+4	6
Exeter City	2	1	0	1	1	2	−1	3
Plymouth Argyle	2	0	0	2	1	4	−3	0

Date	Team 1	Score	Team 2
28 Sep	Plymouth Argyle	1–3	Swansea City
19 Oct	Swansea City	2–0	Exeter City
9 Nov	Exeter City	1–0	Plymouth Argyle

Group 3
Team	Pld	W	D	L	GF	GA	GD	Pts
Hereford United	2	1	1	0	2	1	+1	4
Northampton Town	2	0	2	0	1	1	0	2
Walsall	2	0	1	1	0	1	−1	1

Date	Team 1	Score	Team 2
28 Sep	Hereford United	1–0	Walsall
19 Oct	Walsall	0–0	Northampton Town
9 Nov	Northampton Town	1–1	Hereford United

Group 4
Team	Pld	W	D	L	GF	GA	GD	Pts
Bristol Rovers	2	2	0	0	4	0	+4	6
Cardiff City	2	1	0	1	2	3	−1	3
Torquay United	2	0	0	2	0	3	−3	0

Date	Team 1	Score	Team 2
28 Sep	Torquay United	0–1	Bristol Rovers
20 Oct	Bristol Rovers	3–0	Cardiff City
9 Nov	Cardiff City	2–0	Torquay United

Group 5
Team	Pld	W	D	L	GF	GA	GD	Pts
Reading	2	1	1	0	3	2	+1	4
Fulham	2	1	0	1	4	2	+2	3
Brighton & Hove Albion	2	0	1	1	3	6	−3	1

Date	Team 1	Score	Team 2
28 Sep	Fulham	4–1	Brighton & Hove Albion
20 Oct	Brighton & Hove Albion	2–2	Reading
10 Nov	Reading	1–0	Fulham

Group 6
Team	Pld	W	D	L	GF	GA	GD	Pts
Cambridge United	2	1	1	0	4	2	+2	4
Colchester United	2	0	2	0	2	2	0	2
Gillingham	2	0	1	1	0	2	−2	1

Date	Team 1	Score	Team 2
28 Sep	Gillingham	0–0	Colchester United
19 Oct	Colchester United	2–2	Cambridge United
9 Nov	Cambridge United	2–0	Gillingham

Group 7
Team	Pld	W	D	L	GF	GA	GD	Pts
Wycombe Wanderers	2	2	0	0	4	2	+2	6
Brentford	2	0	1	1	4	5	−1	1
Barnet	2	0	1	1	2	3	−1	1

Date	Team 1	Score	Team 2
28 Sep	Wycombe Wanderers	1–0	Barnet
19 Oct	Barnet	2–2	Brentford
9 Nov	Brentford	2–3	Wycombe Wanderers

== Second round ==
=== Northern Section ===
Date	Home team	Score	Away team
30 November	Carlisle United	2 – 1	Bury
30 November	Huddersfield Town	0 – 0	Preston North End
Huddersfield Town won 5–3 on penalties
30 November	Lincoln City	3 – 2	Darlington
30 November	Stockport County	4 – 0	Rochdale
1 December	Scarborough	0 – 2	Scunthorpe United
4 December	York City	1 – 1	Mansfield Town
Mansfield Town won 5-4 on penalties
7 December	Bradford City	2 – 3	Crewe Alexandra
7 December	Chester City	1 – 0	Rotherham United

=== Southern Section ===
Date	Home team	Score	Away team
30 November	Cambridge United	2 – 4	Port Vale
30 November	Hereford United	1 – 2	Brentford
1 December	Bristol Rovers	2 – 2	Fulham
Fulham won 4-3 on penalties
1 December	Reading	4 – 1	Northampton Town
4 December	Wrexham	0 – 1	Colchester United
7 December	Swansea City	2 – 1	Exeter City
14 December	Wycombe Wanderers	3 – 2	Cardiff City
21 December	Bournemouth	1 – 1	Leyton Orient
Leyton Orient won 5-3 on penalties

== Quarter-finals ==
=== Northern Section ===
Date	Home team	Score	Away team
11 January	Carlisle United	2 – 1	Mansfield Town
11 January	Huddersfield Town	3 – 2	Crewe Alexandra
11 January	Lincoln City	1 – 0	Chester City
11 January	Stockport County	2 – 0	Scunthorpe United

=== Southern Section ===
Date	Home team	Score	Away team
11 January	Colchester United	0 – 1	Wycombe Wanderers
11 January	Fulham	1 – 0	Reading
11 January	Leyton Orient	1 – 0	Brentford
11 January	Swansea City	1 – 0	Port Vale

== Area semi-finals ==
=== Northern Section ===
Date	Home team	Score	Away team
8 February	Carlisle United	2 – 1	Lincoln City
1 March	Stockport County	0 – 1	Huddersfield Town

=== Southern Section ===
Date	Home team	Score	Away team
8 February	Fulham	2 – 2	Wycombe Wanderers
Wycombe Wanderers won 4-2 on penalties
8 February	Leyton Orient	0 – 2	Swansea City

== Area finals ==
=== Northern Area final ===
8 March 1994	Huddersfield Town	4–1	Carlisle United	Leeds Road, Huddersfield
				Attendance: 10,552

22 March 1994	Carlisle United	2–0 (3–4 agg.)	Huddersfield Town	Brunton Park, Carlisle
				Attendance: 8,330

=== Southern Area final ===
1 March 1994	Swansea City	3–1	Wycombe Wanderers	Vetch Field, Swansea
		Report		Attendance: 6,335

22 March 1994	Wycombe Wanderers	1–0 (2–3 agg.)	Swansea City	Adams Park, High Wycombe
		Report		Attendance: 6,710

== Final ==
24 April 1994
14:30 BST

Huddersfield Town	1–1 (a.e.t.)	Swansea City
Logan 60'	(Report)	McFarlane 8'
Penalties
Mitchell (penalty missed); Scully (penalty scored); Starbuck (penalty missed); Cowan (penalty missed)	1–3	(penalty scored) Cornforth; (penalty scored) Ampadu; (penalty scored) Torpey

Wembley Stadium, London
Attendance: 47,773
Referee: Jim Rushton (Stoke-on-Trent)

== Notes ==
General

- statto.com

Specific
