= 2002–03 Cardiff City F.C. season =

Welsh football club season

Cardiff City
2002–03 season
- Chairman: Sam Hammam
- Manager: Lennie Lawrence
- Division Two: 6th
- FA Cup: Third round
- Carling Cup: Second round
- LDV Vans Trophy: Quarter-finals
- FAW Premier Cup: Semi-finals
- Top goalscorer: League: Robert Earnshaw (31); All: Robert Earnshaw (35)
- Highest home attendance: 15,245 vs Queens Park Rangers (5 April 2003)
- Lowest home attendance: 11,389 vs Notts County (8 March 2003)
- Average home league attendance: 13,049

During the 2002–03 season Cardiff City played in the Football League Division Two. They finished in six place and were promoted to Division One after beating Queens Park Rangers in the play-off final in Cardiff.this was helped by An ex Cardiff City employee, Neil MacNamara who triggered fire alarms at the hotel where the QPR team where staying at 3am of the day of the match

The season also saw Robert Earnshaw break the 56-year record of 30 league goals held by Stan Richards and the record of Hughie Ferguson of 32 goals in all competitions.

== Squad ==
No.	Pos	Nat	Player	Total		Championship		FA Cup		League Cup		LDV Vans Trophy	
No.	Pos	Nat	Player	Apps	Goals	Apps	Goals	Apps	Goals	Apps	Goals	Apps	Goals
1	GK	(Scotland) SCO	Neil Alexander	48	0	43	0	4	0	1	0	0	0
2	DF	(Wales) WAL	Rhys Weston	50	2	42	2	5	0	2	0	1	0
3	DF	(Wales) WAL	Andy Legg	46	3	38	3	5	0	2	0	1	0
4	MF	(England) ENG	Gareth Whalley	23	0	22	0	0	0	1	0	0	0
5	DF	(England) ENG	Spencer Prior	46	0	40	0	4	0	2	0	0	0
6	DF	(Wales) WAL	Danny Gabbidon	28	0	27	0	0	0	1	0	0	0
7	FW	(England) ENG	Andy Campbell	40	7	31	4	5	2	2	0	2	1
8	MF	(Republic of Ireland) IRL	Graham Kavanagh	50	4	47	4	1	0	2	0	0	0
9	FW	(England) ENG	Leo Fortune-West	28	4	19	2	5	1	2	0	2	1
10	FW	(Wales) WAL	Robert Earnshaw	55	35	49	31	4	1	2	3	0	0
11	FW	(England) ENG	Peter Thorne	55	16	49	14	4	1	1	1	1	0
12	MF	(Republic of Ireland) IRL	Willie Boland	50	1	44	0	4	1	2	0	0	0
13	GK	(Wales) WAL	Martyn Margetson	10	0	6	0	1	0	1	0	2	0
14	FW	(Wales) WAL	Jason Bowen	18	4	11	3	5	0	0	0	2	1
15	MF	(England) ENG	Mark Bonner	19	0	17	0	0	0	0	0	2	0
16	MF	(Wales) WAL	Leyton Maxwell	22	0	16	0	3	0	2	0	1	0
17	DF	(Wales) WAL	James Collins	7	2	2	0	3	2	0	0	2	0
18	DF	(Wales) WAL	Scott Young	14	1	12	1	2	0	0	0	0	0
19	MF	(England) ENG	Michael Simpkins	2	0	0	0	0	0	0	0	2	0
19	MF	(England) ENG	Gareth Ainsworth	9	0	9	0	0	0	0	0	0	0
20	FW	(England) ENG	Gavin Gordon	11	3	10	2	0	0	0	0	1	1
21	MF	(Wales) WAL	David Hughes	0	0	0	0	0	0	0	0	0	0
22	GK	(Wales) WAL	Mark Walton	0	0	0	0	0	0	0	0	0	0
23	DF	(England) ENG	Chris Barker	50	0	43	0	5	0	1	0	1	0
24	MF	(Wales) WAL	Gethin Jones	0	0	0	0	0	0	0	0	0	0
25	DF	(England) ENG	Des Hamilton	12	0	6	0	3	0	1	0	2	0
26	DF	(England) ENG	Gary Croft	51	1	45	1	4	0	2	0	0	0
27	DF	(Wales) WAL	Ryan Green	1	0	0	0	0	0	0	0	1	0
27	DF	(Wales) WAL	Josh Low	0	0	0	0	0	0	0	0	0	0
27	MF	(Republic of Ireland) IRL	Alan Mahon	15	2	15	2	0	0	0	0	0	0
28	DF	(Scotland) SCO	Andy Jordan	0	0	0	0	0	0	0	0	0	0
29	MF	(Wales) WAL	Kevin Evans	0	0	0	0	0	0	0	0	0	0
30	MF	(Wales) WAL	Martyn Giles	0	0	0	0	0	0	0	0	0	0
31	GK	(Wales) WAL	Lee Kendall	0	0	0	0	0	0	0	0	0	0
32	DF	(Wales) WAL	Steve Jenkins	4	0	4	0	0	0	0	0	0	0
33	DF	(China) CHN	Fan Zhiyi	7	0	6	0	0	0	0	0	1	0

== Standings ==
Pos	Team	Pld	W	D	L	GF	GA	GD	Pts	Promotion or relegation
4	Queens Park Rangers	46	24	11	11	69	45	+24	83	Qualification for the Second Division play-offs
5	Oldham Athletic	46	22	16	8	68	38	+30	82	Qualification for the Second Division play-offs
6	Cardiff City (O, P)	46	23	12	11	68	43	+25	81	Qualification for the Second Division play-offs
7	Tranmere Rovers	46	23	11	12	66	57	+9	80	
8	Plymouth Argyle	46	17	14	15	63	52	+11	65	

Rules for classification: In the Football League goals scored (GF) takes precedence over goal difference (GD).
(O) Play-off winners; (P) Promoted

=== Results by round ===
Round	1	2	3	4	5	6	7	8	9	10	11	12	13	14	15	16	17	18	19	20	21	22	23	24	25	26	27	28	29	30	31	32	33	34	35	36	37	38	39	40	41	42	43	44	45	46
Ground	A	H	H	A	H	A	H	H	A	A	H	A	H	A	H	A	H	A	H	A	H	A	A	H	H	H	A	H	A	H	H	A	A	A	H	A	H	H	H	A	A	A	H	A	H	A
Result	W	W	L	W	D	D	W	W	W	D	W	D	W	L	W	W	W	L	W	W	L	W	L	W	D	W	L	D	W	D	D	W	D	W	L	D	W	W	L	W	W	L	L	L	D	D
Position	~	2	5	3	5	5	8	4	4	1	1	2	1	2	2	1	1	3	2	1	3	2	2	2	2	4	4	4	3	3	3	3	3	3	3	3	3	2	4	3	3	3	3	4	5	6
Points	3	6	6	9	10	11	14	17	20	21	24	25	28	28	31	34	37	37	40	43	43	46	46	49	50	53	53	54	57	58	59	62	63	66	66	67	70	73	73	76	79	79	79	79	80	81

A = Away; H = Home; W = Win; D = Draw; L = Loss

== Fixtures and results ==
=== Division Two ===
10 August 2002 1	Oldham Athletic	1–2	Cardiff City	Oldham
15:00	Lee Duxbury 90'		21' Andy Campbell; 84' Robert Earnshaw	Stadium: Boundary Park; Attendance: 8,033; Referee: Eddie Wolstenholme (Lancashire)

13 August 2002 2	Cardiff City	3–1	Port Vale	Cardiff
	Peter Thorne 4'; Leo Fortune-West 9'; Andy Legg 69'		40' (pen.) Marc Bridge-Wilkinson	Stadium: Ninian Park; Attendance: 13,296; Referee: Paul Rejer (Staffordshire)

17 August 2002 3	Cardiff City	1–2	Northampton Town	Cardiff
15:00	Graham Kavanagh 13'		10', 50' Marco Gabbiadini	Stadium: Ninian Park; Attendance: 13,321; Referee: Lee Cable (Woking)

24 August 2002 4	Swindon Town	0–1	Cardiff City	Swindon
15:00			28' Leo Fortune-West	Stadium: County Ground; Attendance: 7,564; Referee: Barry Knight (Kent)

26 August 2002 5	Cardiff City	0–0	Luton Town	Cardiff
15:00				Stadium: Ninian Park; Attendance: 13,564; Referee: Paul Danson (Leicester)

31 August 2002 6	Cheltenham Town	1–1	Cardiff City	Cheltenham
15:00	Neil Howarth 32'		11' Andy Campbell	Stadium: Whaddon Road; Attendance: 4,395; Referee: Graham Barber (Hertfordshire)

14 September 2002 7	Cardiff City	2–1	Stockport County	Cardiff
15:00	Robert Earnshaw 2'; Graham Kavanagh 38'		16' Luke Beckett	Stadium: Ninian Park; Attendance: 11,546; Referee: Andy Hall (West Midlands)

17 September 2002 8	Cardiff City	2–0	Brentford	Cardiff
19:45	Andy Legg 28'; Robert Earnshaw 73'			Stadium: Ninian Park; Attendance: 12,062; Referee: Guy Stretton (West Bridgford)

21 September 2002 9	Notts County	0–1	Cardiff City	Nottingham
15:00			20' Gary Croft	Stadium: Meadow Lane; Attendance: 6,118; Referee: Paul Robinson (East Yorkshire)

24 September 2002 10	Plymouth Argyle	2–2	Cardiff City	Plymouth
19:45	Paul Wotton 8'; Graham Coughlan 90'		2', 67' Robert Earnshaw	Stadium: Home Park; Attendance: 11,606; Referee: Clive Wilkes (Oxford)

28 September 2002 11	Cardiff City	2–1	Crewe Alexandra	Cardiff
	Robert Earnshaw 84', 86'		48' Rob Hulse	Stadium: Ninian Park; Attendance: 13,208; Referee: Graham Salisbury (Lancashire)

5 October 2002 12	Wigan Athletic	2–2	Cardiff City	Wigan
	Tony Dinning 26'; Nathan Ellington 28'		20', 86' Robert Earnshaw	Stadium: JJB Stadium; Attendance: 8,047; Referee: Eddie Wolstenholme (Lancashire)

12 October 2002 13	Cardiff City	1–0	Wycombe Wanderers	Cardiff
	Graham Kavanagh 79'			Stadium: Ninian Park; Attendance: 13,109; Referee: Trevor Parkes (West Midlands)

19 October 2002 14	Blackpool	1–0	Cardiff City	Blackpool
	John Hills 52'			Stadium: Bloomfield Road; Attendance: 7,744; Referee: Mike Riley (West Yorkshire)

26 October 2002 15	Cardiff City	4–0	Tranmere Rovers	Cardiff
17:35	Peter Thorne 29', 82'; Robert Earnshaw 42' (pen.); Rhys Weston 90'			Stadium: Ninian Park; Attendance: 12,096; Referee: Clive Penton (Sussex)

29 October 2002 16	Mansfield Town	0–1	Cardiff City	Mansfield
			70' Peter Thorne	Stadium: Field Mill; Attendance: 3,421; Referee: Neale Barry (Lincolnshire)

2 November 2002 17	Cardiff City	3–0	Peterborough United	Cardiff
	Graham Kavanagh 19'; Robert Earnshaw 54' (pen.); Rhys Weston 58'			Stadium: Ninian Park; Attendance: 12,918; Referee: Paul Danson (Leicester)

9 November 2002 18	Barnsley	3–2	Cardiff City	Barnsley
	Chris Morgan 22', 64'; Rory Fallon 30'		23', 42' Robert Earnshaw	Stadium: Oakwell; Attendance: 10,894; Referee: Chris Foy (Lancashire)

24 November 2002 19	Cardiff City	1–0	Chesterfield	Cardiff
	Peter Thorne 12'			Stadium: Ninian Park; Attendance: 13,331; Referee: Richard Beeby (Northampton)

29 November 2002 20	Queens Park Rangers	0–4	Cardiff City	London
			59', 65', 87' Robert Earnshaw; 90' Andy Campbell	Stadium: Loftus Road; Attendance: 14,345; Referee: Clive Wilkes (Oxford)

14 December 2002 21	Cardiff City	0–2	Bristol City	Cardiff
17:35			49' (pen.) Brian Tinnion; 76' Christian Roberts	Stadium: Ninian Park; Attendance: 15,239; Referee: Alan Wiley (Staffordshire)

20 December 2002 22	Colchester United	1–2	Cardiff City	Colchester
	Mick Stockwell 52'		45' Robert Earnshaw; 77' Robert Earnshaw	Stadium: Layer Road; Attendance: 3,096; Referee: Uriah Rennie (South Yorkshire)

26 December 2002 23	Luton Town	2–0	Cardiff City	Luton
12:00	Tony Thorpe 80'; Steve Howard 90'			Stadium: Kenilworth Road; Attendance: 7,805; Referee: Paul Armstrong (Berkshire)

29 December 2002 24	Cardiff City	4–0	Huddersfield Town	Cardiff
	Jason Bowen 19', 64'; Robert Earnshaw 44', 73'			Stadium: Ninian Park; Attendance: 13,703; Referee: Scott Mathieson (Cheshire)

1 January 2003 25	Cardiff City	1–1	Swindon Town	Cardiff
15:00	Robert Earnshaw 89'		70' Sam Parkin	Stadium: Ninian Park; Attendance: 13,062; Referee: Andy Penn (West Midlands)

18 January 2003 26	Cardiff City	2–1	Cheltenham Town	Cardiff
15:00	Peter Thorne 8'; Robert Earnshaw 36'		19' John Finnigan	Stadium: Ninian Park; Attendance: 11,607; Referee: Dermot Gallagher (Oxfordshire)

25 January 2003 27	Huddersfield Town	1–0	Cardiff City	Huddersfield
15:00	Andy Booth 80'			Stadium: Kirklees Stadium; Attendance: 9,462; Referee: George Cain (Bootle, Merseyside)

31 January 2003 28	Cardiff City	1–1	Oldham Athletic	Cardiff
19:45	Jason Bowen 35'		87' David Eyres	Stadium: Ninian Park; Attendance: 12,579; Referee: Peter Walton (Northamptonshire)

4 February 2003 29	Northampton Town	0–1	Cardiff City	Northampton
			58' Robert Earnshaw	Stadium: Sixfields Stadium; Attendance: 4,553; Referee: Ray Olivier (Sutton Coldfield)

8 February 2003 30	Cardiff City	1–1	Barnsley	Cardiff
	Gavin Gordon 90'		52' (pen.) Bruce Dyer	Stadium: Ninian Park; Attendance: 12,759; Referee: Guy Stretton (West Bridgford)

21 February 2003 31	Cardiff City	1–1	Plymouth Argyle	Cardiff
	Robert Earnshaw 42'		86' Paul Wotton	Stadium: Ninian Park; Attendance: 14,006; Referee: Mark Warren (Walsall)

25 February 2003 32	Port Vale	0–2	Cardiff City	Port Vale
			35' Gavin Gordon; 64' Peter Thorne	Stadium: Vale Park; Attendance: 3,831; Referee: Paul Taylor (Middlesex)

1 March 2003 33	Stockport County	1–1	Cardiff City	Stockport
	Peter Clark 26'		81' Peter Thorne	Stadium: Edgeley Park; Attendance: 5,385; Referee: Phil Dowd (Stoke-on-Trent)

4 March 2003 34	Brentford	0–2	Cardiff City	London
			52' Scott Young; 78' Robert Earnshaw	Stadium: Griffin Park; Attendance: 5,727; Referee: Mick Thorpe (Suffolk)

8 March 2003 35	Cardiff City	0–2	Notts County	Cardiff
			62' (pen.) Mark Stallard; 80' Mark Stallard	Stadium: Ninian Park; Attendance: 11,389; Referee: Lee Cable (Woking)

14 March 2003 36	Tranmere Rovers	3–3	Cardiff City	Birkenhead
	Simon Haworth 47'; Iain Hume 78'; Gary Jones 89'		35', 68', 90' Robert Earnshaw	Stadium: Prenton Park; Attendance: 9,367; Referee: Alan Butler (Cheshire)

18 March 2003 37	Cardiff City	2–1	Blackpool	Cardiff
	Robert Earnshaw 44'; Alan Mahon 51'		37' Scott Taylor	Stadium: Ninian Park; Attendance: 11,788; Referee: Scott Mathieson (Cheshire)

21 March 2003 38	Cardiff City	1–0	Mansfield Town	Cardiff
	Robert Earnshaw 62'			Stadium: Ninian Park; Attendance: 13,009; Referee: Grant Hegley (Hertfordshire)

5 April 2003 39	Cardiff City	1–2	Queens Park Rangers	Cardiff
	Peter Thorne 78'		64' Paul Furlong; 89' Richard Langley	Stadium: Ninian Park; Attendance: 15,235; Referee: Paul Armstrong (Berkshire)

8 April 2003 40	Wycombe Wanderers	0–4	Cardiff City	High Wycombe
			5', 81' Peter Thorne; 68' Alan Mahon; 84' Andy Legg	Stadium: Adams Park; Attendance: 5,889; Referee: Clive Penton (Sussex)

13 April 2003 41	Chesterfield	0–3	Cardiff City	Chesterfield
14:00			24' Graham Kavanagh; 35', 82' Peter Thorne	Stadium: Saltergate; Attendance: 4,398; Referee: Dermot Gallagher (Oxfordshire)

16 April 2003 42	Peterborough United	2–0	Cardiff City	Peterborough
15:00	Matt Gill 38'; Leon McKenzie 70'			Stadium: London Road; Attendance: 4,984; Referee: Eddie Evans (Manchester)

19 April 2003 43	Cardiff City	0–3	Colchester United	Cardiff
			4' Karl Duguid; 61' Kem Izzet; 73' Dean Morgan	Stadium: Ninian Park; Attendance: 12,633; Referee: Steve Tomlin (Lewes)

22 April 2003 44	Bristol City	2–0	Cardiff City	Bristol
	Brian Tinnion 55' (pen.); Christian Roberts 73'			Stadium: Ashton Gate; Attendance: 15,615; Referee: Rob Styles (Dorset)

26 April 2003 45	Cardiff City	0–0	Wigan Athletic	Cardiff
				Stadium: Ninian Park; Attendance: 14,702; Referee: David Crick (Surrey)

3 May 2003 46	Crewe Alexandra	1–1	Cardiff City	Crewe
	Richard Walker 45'		64' Robert Earnshaw	Stadium: Gresty Road; Attendance: 9,562; Referee: Roy Pearson (Durham)

=== Play-Offs ===
10 May 2003 Semi Final (First leg)	Cardiff City	1–0	Bristol City	Cardiff
15:00	Peter Thorne 74'	BBC report		Stadium: Ninian Park; Attendance: 19,146; Referee: Howard Webb (Yorkshire)

13 May 2003 Semi Final (Second leg)	Bristol City	0–0 (0–1 agg.)	Cardiff City	Bristol
19:45		11v11 report		Stadium: Ashton Gate; Attendance: 16,307; Referee: Jeff Winter (Middlesbrough)

25 May 2003 Final	Queens Park Rangers	0–1 (a.e.t.)	Cardiff City	Cardiff
15:00		BBC report Sky report	114' Andy Campbell	Stadium: Millennium Stadium; Attendance: 66,096; Referee: Howard Webb (Yorkshire)

=== League Cup ===
11 September 2002 Round 1	Boston United	1–5	Cardiff City	Boston
	Paul Ellender 52'		25', 36', 42' Robert Earnshaw; 45' Chris Barker; 67' Peter Thorne	Stadium: York Street; Attendance: 2,280; Referee: Mick Fletcher (Worcestershire)

1 October 2002 Round 2	Tottenham Hotspur	1–0	Cardiff City	Tottenham
	Teddy Sheringham 30'			Stadium: White Hart Lane; Attendance: 23,723; Referee: Scott Mathieson (Cheshire)

=== FA Cup ===
18 November 2002 Round 1	Tranmere Rovers	2–2	Cardiff City	Birkenhead
	Stuart Barlow 7'; Simon Haworth 62'		34' James Collins; 44' Graham Kavanagh	Stadium: Prenton Park; Attendance: 5,592; Referee: Mick Fletcher (Worcestershire)

26 November 2002 Round 1 (Replay)	Cardiff City	2–1	Tranmere Rovers	Cardiff
	Andy Campbell 60'; James Collins 68'		45' Micky Mellon	Stadium: Ninian Park; Attendance: 6,853; Referee: Mick Fletcher (Worcestershire)

7 December 2002 Round 2	Margate	0–3	Cardiff City	Margate
			28' Peter Thorne; 34' Willie Boland; 88' Leo Fortune-West	Stadium: Crabble Athletic Ground; Attendance: 1,362; Referee: Ray Olivier (Sutton Coldfield)

4 January 2003 Round 3	Cardiff City	2–2	Coventry City	Cardiff
	Robert Earnshaw 76'; Andy Campbell 90'		27' Lee Mills; 55' (pen.) Gary McAllister	Stadium: Ninian Park; Attendance: 16,101; Referee: Graham Poll (Hertfordshire)

15 January 2003 Round 3 (Replay)	Coventry City	3–0	Cardiff City	Coventry
	Lee Fowler 21'; Dean Holdsworth 57'; Jay Bothroyd 89'			Stadium: Highfield Road; Attendance: 11,997; Referee: Graham Poll (Hertfordshire)

=== LDV Vans Trophy ===
12 November 2002 Round 2	Exeter City	0–3	Cardiff City	Exeter
			49' Jason Bowen; 61' (pen.) Andy Campbell; 90' Leo Fortune-West	Stadium: St James Park; Attendance: 1,360; Referee: Peter Walton (Northamptonshire)

10 December 2002 Round 3	Bournemouth	2–1 (a.e.t.)	Cardiff City	Bournemouth
	Wade Elliott 79'; James Hayter 114'		81' Gavin Gordon	Stadium: Dean Court; Attendance: 3,615; Referee: Paul Taylor (Middlesex)

=== FAW Premier Cup ===
28 January 2003 Quarter Final	Total Network Solutions	1–3	Cardiff City	Llansantffraid-ym-Mechain
	Steve Anthrobus		Gavin Gordon; Gavin Gordon; Stuart Fleetwood	Stadium: Park Hall; Attendance: 500

24 March 2003 Semi Final	Newport County	0–0 (a.e.t.) (4–2 p)	Cardiff City	Newport
				Stadium: Newport Stadium; Attendance: 1,160; Referee: Steve Hames (Aberdare)

== Bibliography ==
- Hayes, Dean (2006). The Who's Who of Cardiff City. Breedon Books. ISBN 1-85983-462-0.
- Shepherd, Richard (2002). The Definitive Cardiff City F.C. Tony Brown. ISBN 1-899-46817-X.
- Rollin, Glenda; Rollin, Jack, eds. (2002). Rothmans Football Yearbook 2003-2004. Headline Book Publishing. ISBN 0-7553-1228-7.

== See also ==
- Cardiff City F.C. seasons
- 2002–03 in English football
- 2003 Football League Second Division play-off final
