= Cardiff City F.C. 2–1 Leeds United F.C. (2002) =

Association football match during the 2001–02 FA Cup

Cardiff City v Leeds United
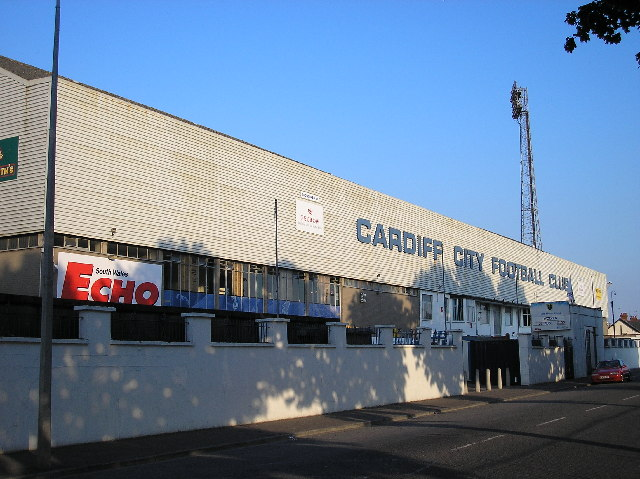
- The match was played at Ninian Park
- Event: 2001–02 FA Cup
Cardiff City	Leeds United
(Wales)	(England)
2	1
- Date: 6 January 2002
- Venue: Ninian Park, Cardiff
- Referee: Andy D'Urso (Essex)
- Attendance: 22,009

The 2001–02 FA Cup third-round association football match between Cardiff City and Leeds United was played at Ninian Park, Cardiff, on 6 January 2002. The visitors Leeds went into the match as strong favourites given the gulf in divisions that separated the two teams; Leeds were leading the Premier League at the time while Cardiff were placed 10th in the Second Division, the third tier and two tiers below their opposition. Leeds entered the FA Cup in the third round, receiving byes in the opening rounds as they participated in the Premier League, while Cardiff had won their first two ties to reach this stage of the competition.

The match was played in front of more than 22,000 spectators, the largest attendance for any fixture played at Ninian Park during the season, and was refereed by Andy D'Urso. Cardiff attacked their opponents early on but Leeds took the lead in the 12th minute via a goal from striker Mark Viduka. Cardiff equalised shortly after, when Graham Kavanagh scored direct from a free-kick. Shortly before half-time, Leeds midfielder Alan Smith was controversially sent off by referee D'Urso after clashing with Cardiff's Andy Legg. In the second half, Leeds played more defensively to compensate for Smith's dismissal. With three minutes remaining, Scott Young volleyed the ball into the net from a corner to give Cardiff the lead and the eventual win. The victory was described by Henry Winter as "one of the greatest upsets in FA Cup history".

As the match ended, Cardiff fans launched a pitch invasion that led to confrontations between the two sets of supporters. Police were forced to intervene and pushed the home crowd away from the visiting supporters. Four arrests were made at the game while more were made in the ensuing weeks based on police footage and Cardiff and their fans faced widespread criticism. Club chairman Sam Hammam had altercations with a BBC reporter and Leeds manager David O'Leary in the immediate aftermath of the game. Cardiff were eventually fined £20,000 over the pitch invasion.

== Background ==
As a Premier League side, Leeds United received byes through the first two rounds of the 2001–02 FA Cup and entered the competition in the third round. They were drawn against Second Division side Cardiff City. At the time of the match, Leeds were placed first in the Premier League, the top tier of English football, while Cardiff were in 10th position in their division, two tiers below Leeds. Prior to the match, Leeds had lost only twice in league competition during the season and five times in total from 29 matches in all competitions. Leeds had also reached the semi-final of the UEFA Champions League the previous season before being defeated by Spanish side Valencia 3–0 on aggregate. Leeds had further strengthened their squad with the signing of Robbie Fowler from Liverpool less than two months before the fixture for a fee of around £11 million.

The two sides had not met in competitive competition since the 1984–85 season, during which they recorded a 1–1 draw and a 2–1 victory for Cardiff. The gulf in positions between the two sides led Leeds manager David O'Leary to confidently predict that his side "will start and end our FA Cup run in Cardiff" in reference to the final being held at the Millennium Stadium in Cardiff.

Ahead of the match, Leeds defender Michael Duberry returned to the first team after recovering from a leg injury. This was the first time Duberry had been involved with the side since testifying against teammate Jonathan Woodgate during a much-publicised legal case following an incident in 2000 in which Woodgate and teammate Lee Bowyer were accused of attacking a student outside a nightclub in Leeds. Woodgate had accused Duberry of lying in court and declared the two were "no longer friends". Woodgate was eventually found guilty of affray three weeks before the match, but was cleared of causing grievous bodily harm, and was ordered to complete 100 hours of community service. Bowyer was cleared of all charges, while Duberry subsequently received death threats over his decision.

Cardiff meanwhile had been considerably more erratic in their division. The side had won promotion from the Third Division under manager Alan Cork the previous season and chairman Sam Hammam had invested heavily in the team. Cardiff had broken their transfer record twice in the opening months of the season, first signing midfielder Graham Kavanagh from Stoke City for £1 million before signing striker Peter Thorne from the same side for a further £1.75m. The club had also signed Spencer Prior from Manchester City for £700,000, Neil Alexander from Livingston for £130,000 and Des Hamilton from Newcastle United. This investment had raised expectations of the club's ability to immediately challenge for promotion again, but they entered the match on a four-game winless streak.

Cardiff had entered the FA Cup in the first round in November 2001 where they were drawn against non-League opponents Tiverton Town. The match was switched to Cardiff's Ninian Park over safety concerns at Tiverton's Ladysmead ground. Cardiff advanced after securing a 3–1 victory with goals from Leo Fortune-West, Paul Brayson and Robert Earnshaw. One month later, Cardiff defeated Port Vale 3–0 in the second round of the competition to reach the third round for the third consecutive season. The draw against Leeds was regarded as a marquee tie for Cardiff and the idea of hosting the fixture at the nearby Millennium Stadium was put forward and the ground was made available if needed by Welsh Rugby Union chairman Glanmor Griffiths. Nevertheless, Hammam declared that promotion from the Second Division remained his priority and that the Leeds match was "the least important". The Football Association rejected the idea of moving the fixture, insisting "there was no compelling reason to move the tie."

Hammam had developed a reputation in English football for his eccentric style. He had previously served as chairman of Wimbledon during which time the club became known as the Crazy Gang. After purchasing Cardiff in August 2000, he attracted attention nationwide on several occasions. In his first year with Cardiff, he inserted a clause in the contract of Spencer Prior that required the defender to eat a dish containing sheep testicles. Cork also claimed that Hammam had bolts loosened on fences surrounding the home fan enclosures at Ninian Park so they would make more noise when rattled during a match. In response to O'Leary's comments before the match, Hammam responded by stating that Cardiff was a "bigger" club than Leeds. Cardiff captain Kavanagh was also confident ahead of the match, predicting weeks before that he knew he was going to score in the game.

=== Pre-match ===
Cardiff were forced into one change for the match. Dean Gordon had returned to his parent club Middlesbrough at the end of his loan spell. In his place, Cork selected 35-year old Andy Legg. Apart from Gordon, Cork made one further change from the club's previous fixture, a 3–1 defeat to Bristol City on 29 December 2001. Jason Bowen was dropped to the substitutes bench with Paul Brayson starting in his place. The more attacking Bowen was dropped in order for Brayson to provide more defensive support. Leeds made one change to their matchday squad from their previous fixture, a 3–0 victory over West Ham United on 1 January, Frazer Richardson replaced Harpal Singh on the bench. Prior to the game, John Charles, who played for both sides during his career, was presented to the crowd and received a standing ovation from fans of both sides.

== Match ==
=== Summary ===
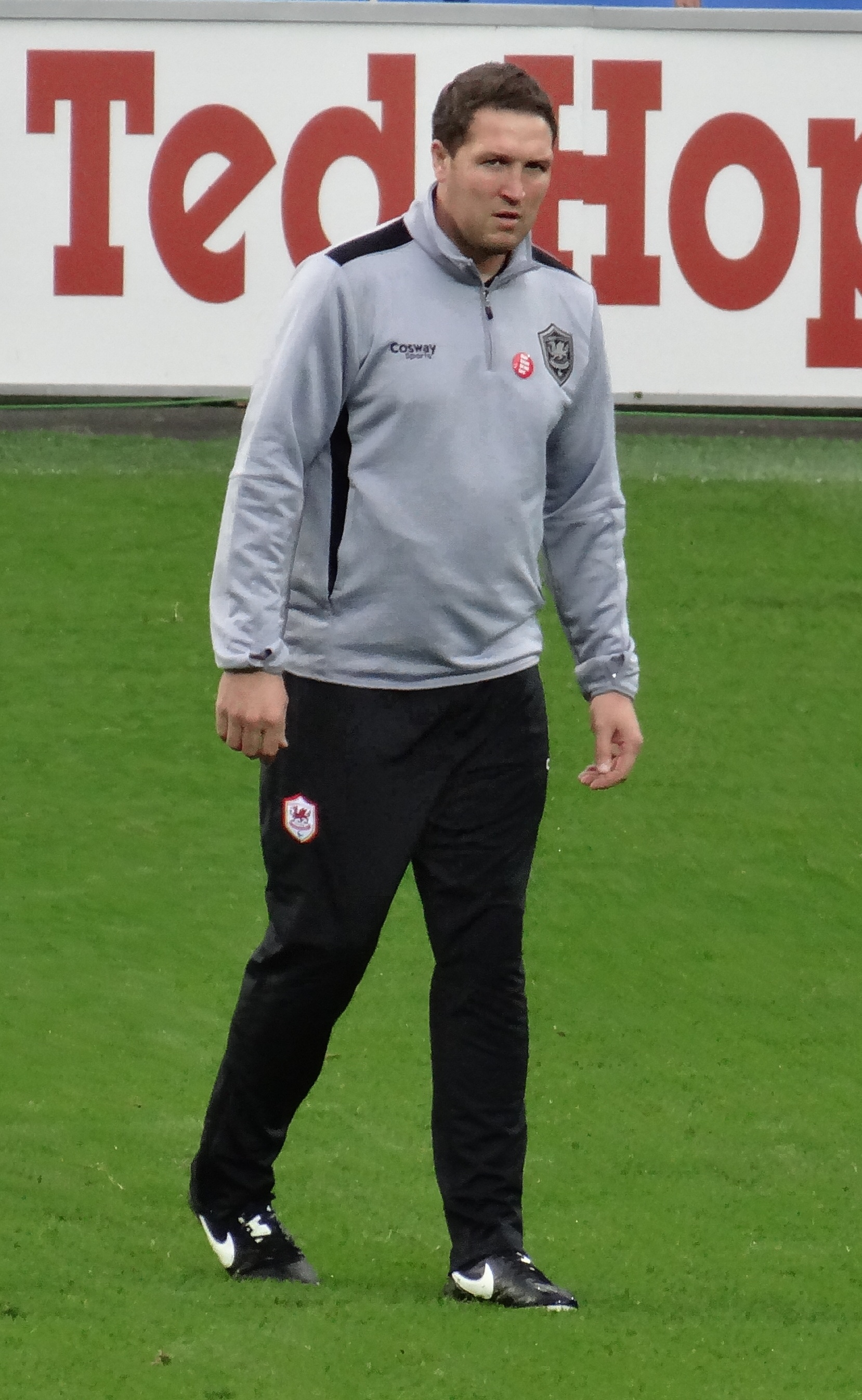
Scott Young scored the winning goal for Cardiff.

The match kicked off at 16:00 GMT in front of 22,009 spectators, the largest crowd Cardiff had attracted for a home fixture during the season. Cardiff attacked their higher-ranked opponents quickly and Robert Earnshaw made several early attempts to pass his opposite fullback, Ian Harte. Crowd trouble flared early on when Harte walked to the sideline to take a throw-in and was narrowly missed by a bottle thrown from the stands. Ten minutes into the game, Leeds suffered an early injury blow when Rio Ferdinand was forced off with ankle ligament damage following a foul by Cardiff striker Gavin Gordon. Ferdinand was replaced by Michael Duberry who joined Jonathan Woodgate in the centre of Leeds' defence. This was the first time the pair had played together since Duberry had testified against Woodgate in court. One match report commented that the pair "barely acknowledged each other" during the rest of the game, although the BBC noted that the pair "played well together".

Two minutes later, Cardiff's Spencer Prior hit a misplaced pass that was controlled by Leeds' captain Gary Kelly. He found teammate Mark Viduka who scored from 20 yards. Leeds' lead was short-lived as Cardiff equalised eight minutes later; Alan Smith fouled Andy Legg 22 yards from the Leeds goal. Cardiff's captain, Graham Kavanagh, converted the free-kick to draw his side level, fulfilling his prediction to score in the weeks leading up to the game. Minutes before half-time, Leeds' Smith was sent off after referee Andy D'Urso adjudged that he had elbowed Cardiff defender Legg in the face. Smith complained that he had simply been attempting to get away from Legg who was marking Smith tightly at the time. Legg suffered a cut mouth in the incident. Smith had been sent off six weeks earlier for a similar incident with Aston Villa defender Alpay Özalan.

In the second half, Leeds switched to a more defensive style to compensate for Smith's dismissal, allowing Cardiff to apply pressure, primarily through the use of long passes and throw-ins into the Leeds area. Towards the end of the match, Hammam began walking around the edge of the pitch as the match continued, an action he often undertook to encourage the home supporters. He was pelted with missiles as he walked past the stand containing Leeds' supporters before remaining stood behind the goal his side were attacking for the remainder of the match. Ten minutes from the end of the match, D'Urso was hit on the head by a coin thrown from the stands and required treatment before continuing. One of D'Urso's assistants was also struck by a missile during the game.

As the match wore on, Cork looked to pressure Leeds with substitutions, initially planning to send on Josh Low before instead opting to replace the tiring Gordon with Leo Fortune-West. Late in the game, Viduka broke through the Cardiff defence and advanced on Alexander's goal but was denied by a late sliding tackle by Cardiff's Scott Young. Cardiff won a corner in the 87th minute of the match, their seventh of the game. Kavanagh took the set piece and crossed the ball into the box where it was headed towards goal by the advancing Fortune-West. The ball bounced into the midriff of Leeds midfielder David Batty who attempted to clear but was beaten to the loose ball by the onrushing Young who volleyed into the Leeds net to give Cardiff the lead. The home side held onto the lead to see out the match and advance to the fourth round.

=== Details ===
6 January 2002
16:00 GMT

Cardiff City (Wales)	2–1	(England) Leeds United
Kavanagh 21'; Young 87'	Report	Viduka 12'

Ninian Park, Cardiff
Attendance: 22,009
Referee: Andy D'Urso (Essex)

Cardiff City	Leeds United

GK	1	Neil Alexander
DF	18	Scott Young
DF	3	Andy Legg
DF	5	Spencer Prior
DF	6	Danny Gabbidon
MF	12	Willie Boland (yellow card) 50'
MF	15	Mark Bonner (yellow card) 81'
MF	8	Graham Kavanagh (c)
FW	10	Robert Earnshaw
FW	14	Paul Brayson
FW	20	Gavin Gordon (substituted off) 79'
Substitutes:
DF	2	Rhys Weston
MF	14	Jason Bowen
MF	23	Layton Maxwell
MF	7	Josh Low
FW	9	Leo Fortune-West (substituted on) 79'
Manager:
Alan Cork

GK	1	Nigel Martyn
DF	18	Danny Mills
DF	2	Gary Kelly (c)
DF	29	Rio Ferdinand (substituted off) 22'
DF	6	Jonathan Woodgate
DF	3	Ian Harte (yellow card) 18'
MF	11	Lee Bowyer
MF	23	David Batty
MF	17	Alan Smith (red card) 43'
FW	9	Mark Viduka
FW	27	Robbie Fowler
Substitutes:
DF	22	Michael Duberry (substituted on) 22' (yellow card) 57'
DF	34	Frazer Richardson
GK	13	Paul Robinson
MF	14	Stephen McPhail
MF	16	Jason Wilcox
Manager:
David O'Leary

Match rules

- 90 minutes.
- Replay if scores still level.
- Five named substitutes.
- Maximum of three substitutions.

== Post-match ==
=== Immediate aftermath ===
As D'Urso blew the final whistle, Cardiff fans immediately ran onto the pitch to celebrate their side's victory. Among the crowd on the pitch was Hammam, who waved a Welsh flag in celebration. Some of these fans quickly approached the section of the ground holding away supporters and missiles were thrown between the two sets of supporters as police intervened. As the situation escalated, the police line launched a baton charge to force the pitch invaders back and police dogs were also brought onto the pitch. Leeds' Lee Bowyer was targeted by a Cardiff fan as he left the field, narrowly avoiding a punch thrown by the supporter, while teammates Batty and Viduka also required assistance from security personnel to leave the pitch. One of the supporters seen to be causing trouble was later identified as Dai Thomas, a former Cardiff player who had previous convictions related to football hooliganism. He was charged with one count of threatening and violent behaviour after being filmed throwing an advertising hoarding at Leeds supporters and was jailed for 60 days as well as being banned from all football grounds in England and Wales for six years. There were minor disturbances outside the ground as Leeds fans returned to their coaches but these were quickly dispersed by police. Four fans were arrested on the night while a further eight were arrested in the following weeks after being identified from police footage. Leeds defender Rio Ferdinand was later quoted as describing Ninian Park as "the scariest ground he'd ever played in".

Hammam left the field and was interviewed by BBC reporter Jonathan Overend. However, Hammam grew dissatisfied with the tone of the interview and subsequently instructed two of his security staff to remove Overend from the ground and confiscate his equipment. The items were later returned to Overend although the tapes had been removed. A second BBC employee attempted to retrieve the recording from Hammam but was also forcibly removed. Hammam later became involved in a further altercation, this time with Leeds manager O'Leary in the club car park. In response to O'Leary's comments before the match, Hammam quipped "you were right about one thing, your FA Cup started and finished in Cardiff." A furious O'Leary advanced on Hammam, grabbing him by his jacket before Leeds chairman Peter Ridsdale intervened and pulled O'Leary away.

=== Later ===
In the days following the match, Hammam described his side's triumph as "a special victory which would lift the profile of Welsh football", while also praising Cork, believing he would become "a great Cardiff City manager." The Daily Telegraph's Henry Winter described the result as "one of the greatest upsets in FA Cup history" in his post-match coverage. Despite their victory, Cardiff suffered a drop in form following the match. They lost their next match, 2–1 to Peterborough United in the Second Division six days later, before being eliminated from the FA Cup in the fourth round at the end of January following a 3–1 defeat to Tranmere Rovers. Three defeats in their next five matches, culminating in a 4–0 defeat to struggling Wigan Athletic, led Cork to resign his position as manager. He was replaced by Lennie Lawrence who led the club to the play-offs where they suffered a defeat to Stoke City.

Hammam was heavily criticised for his decision to walk around the pitch during the game but initially dismissed concerns by commenting "I like to watch the end of the game from behind the goal. I'm entitled to do that, I have a pass that allows me to do that which has been approved by security and proper safety authorities. I'm a lucky mascot for the team and why should I change that just because we're playing Leeds? I did not incite their fans at all." Hammam had received warnings from the Football League on two occasions previously regarding pitchside walks and ultimately relented, announcing that he would cease the walks. Jeff Cooksley, the Chief Superintendent of South Wales Police, partly attributed the crowd trouble to the condition of Ninian Park, describing it as "a very old ground, 70 years old, and is very poorly designed compared with modern standards". The Football Association of Wales later fined Cardiff £20,000 over the pitch invasion but did not uphold further charges over missile throwing or Hammam's pitchside walk.

Leeds' form also slumped after the match. Having only lost two league matches during the season, they failed to win another game for two months and dropped from first place to finish the campaign fifth. The club launched an appeal over the red card shown to Smith but this was quickly dismissed by the Football Association, despite the recipient of the elbow, Andy Legg, testifying in support of Smith. He was given an initial four-match ban, which was extended to five after he received his fifth yellow card of the season in a 3–1 defeat to Newcastle United a week later.

The team's failure to qualify for the Champions League, and subsequently missing out on the revenue it would generate, has been credited as a key factor in the club's financial implosion in the early 2000s. The Yorkshire Post stated that the defeat to Cardiff "symbolised the beginning of Leeds’ dramatic fall from literally the top end of English football", with the club eventually being relegated to the third tier in the space of five years. Chairman Peter Ridsdale stepped down in 2003 and took up the same role with Cardiff three years later.
