= 2003 Football League Second Division play-off final =

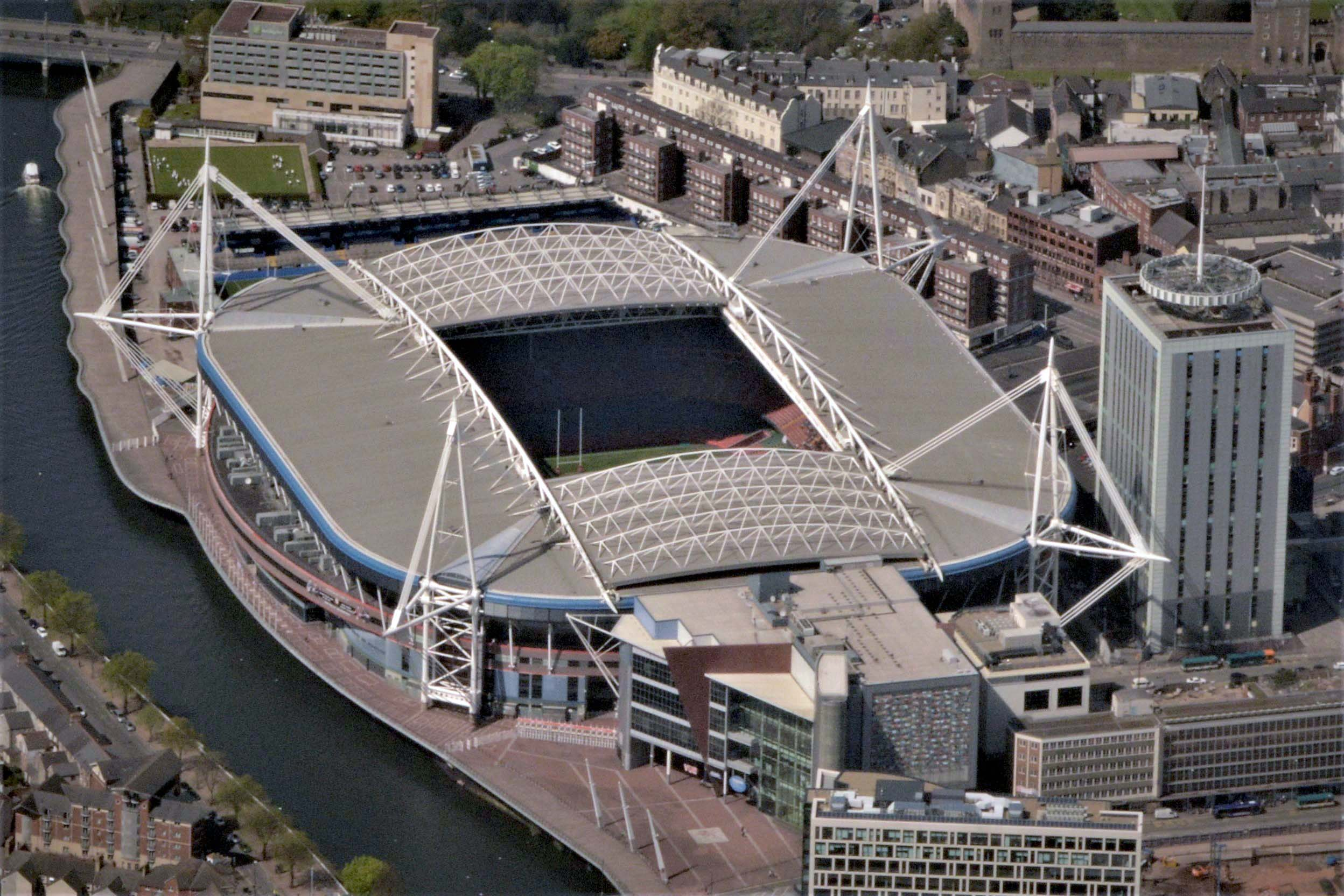
- The final took place at the Millennium Stadium.
Cardiff City	Queens Park Rangers
1	0
- After extra time
- Date: 25 May 2003
- Venue: Millennium Stadium, Cardiff
- Referee: Howard Webb
- Attendance: 66,096

The 2003 Football League Second Division play-off final was a football match played at the Millennium Stadium on 25 May 2003, at the end of the 2002–03 season. The match determined the third and final team to gain promotion from the English Second Division to the First Division, and was contested by fourth-placed Queens Park Rangers and sixth-placed Cardiff City. The teams reached the final by defeating Oldham Athletic and Bristol City respectively in the play-off semi-finals.

The redevelopment of Wembley Stadium meant that Football League play-off final matches held between 2001 and 2006 were played in Cardiff. Both teams were playing at the Millennium Stadium for the first time. The only goal of the game was scored in extra time by Cardiff substitute Andy Campbell who chipped opposition goalkeeper Chris Day to secure promotion for the club to the second tier for the first time since 1985.

== Route to the final ==
Football League Second Division final table, leading positions
Pos	Team	Pld	W	D	L	GF	GA	GD	Pts
1	Wigan Athletic	46	29	13	4	68	25	+43	100
2	Crewe Alexandra	46	25	11	10	76	40	+36	86
3	Bristol City	46	24	11	11	79	48	+31	83
4	Queens Park Rangers	46	24	11	11	69	35	+34	83
5	Oldham Athletic	46	22	16	8	68	38	+30	82
6	Cardiff City	46	23	12	11	68	43	+25	81

The Second Division title was won by Wigan Athletic, who accumulated a club record 100 points. Crewe Alexandra claimed the second automatic promotion place with Bristol City, Queens Park Rangers (QPR), Oldham Athletic and Cardiff City finishing between third and sixth to enter the play-offs.

Queens Park Rangers, who had been relegated to the Second Division two years before, finished the 2002–03 season in fourth place with 83 points. In the play-off semi-finals, QPR faced fifth placed side Oldham Athletic. The first leg was played at Oldham's Boundary Park on 10 May 2003, David Eyres giving Oldham the lead direct from a free-kick. Early in the second half, QPR midfielder Richard Langley equalised before being sent off with ten minutes remaining after a second bookable offence following a confrontation with Eyres. The second leg was played three days later and ended in a 1–0 victory for QPR after Paul Furlong scored the only goal of the game in the 82nd minute, giving his side a 2–1 aggregate victory.

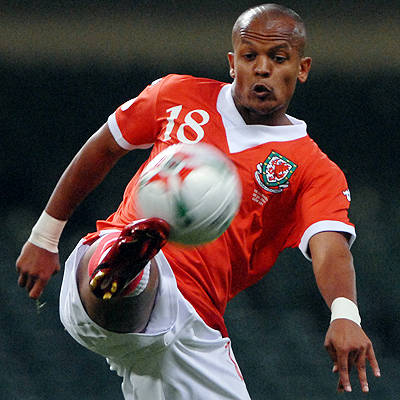
Cardiff striker Robert Earnshaw scored a club record 35 goals during the season.

Cardiff City finished the regular season in sixth place with 81 points, securing the final play-off place with a 1–1 draw against already promoted Crewe Alexandra. Robert Earnshaw's goal in the match broke Stan Richards' club record for league goals scored in a single season and ensured Cardiff gained the single point needed to finish above seventh placed Tranmere Rovers. In the play-off semi-final, Cardiff met Severnside rivals Bristol City. Peter Thorne headed in a Willie Boland cross to score the only goal of the first leg and give Cardiff a 1–0 advantage. Cardiff goalkeeper Neil Alexander was credited with a series of saves in the second leg to deny Bristol an equaliser as the match finished goalless, allowing Cardiff to advance after winning the tie 1–0 on aggregate.

Queens Park Rangers				Cardiff City
Opponent	Result	Legs	Round	Opponent	Result	Legs
Oldham Athletic	2–1	1–0 home; 1–1 away	Semi-finals	Bristol City	1–0	0–0 away; 1–0 home

== Pre-match ==
The two teams were competing for promotion to the First Division, the second tier of the English football league system. Traditionally, play-off final matches were held at Wembley Stadium in London but the redevelopment of the ground saw the matches moved to the Millennium Stadium in Cardiff during the construction works. Neither Cardiff or QPR had ever played a match at the ground.

In previous years, the British national anthem God Save the Queen had been sung during the pre-match ceremony. As Cardiff are a Welsh team, enquiries were made to the Football League regarding the Welsh national anthem Hen Wlad Fy Nhadau also being sung but was rejected with the Football League stating that the match was "a club game, not an international fixture." This was despite both anthems being played prior to the 1997 Football League Third Division play-off final when another Welsh team, Swansea City, played at the original Wembley Stadium. First Minister of Wales Rhodri Morgan criticised the decision commenting that anthems should not be a part of the match but if they were then both should be played. Three days before the match, the Football League announced that no anthems would be played before the match or the First Division and Third Division play-off finals, spokesman John Nagle commenting "playing of the anthem this weekend has become a subject of some controversy. This has begun to detract from both the games themselves [...] this should clearly not be the case." The teams were instead allowed to play their club songs 30 minutes prior to kick-off, Cardiff selecting Men of Harlech and QPR Pig Bag.

QPR manager Ian Holloway made one change from the side that started their play-off semi-final second leg with Richard Pacquette replacing Andy Thomson, while Richard Langley served the second match of his ban following his sending off in the first leg. Before the match, striker Paul Furlong stated his belief that the pressure was on Cardiff to win and described Rangers as underdogs. As Cardiff won a coin toss to decide which team would wear their home colours, QPR chose to wear an all white strip rather than their normal red and black away kit in reference to the strip worn by the QPR side that won the 1967 Football League Cup Final.

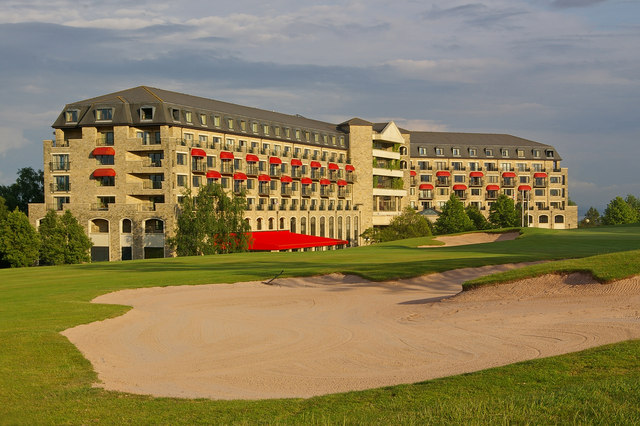
The Celtic Manor Resort where the QPR team stayed the night before the match

The night before the match, members of QPR's team were woken at 3am by a fire alarm being triggered at their hotel, the Celtic Manor Resort. The perpetrator was later arrested and named as Neil McNamara, a Cardiff City fan who had previously worked for the club as a minder for chairman Sam Hammam. He was charged with criminal damage and making a false and malicious fire call. McNamara pled guilty to the charges and was given a five-year banning order after judges ruled the act was committed deliberately to disrupt the QPR squad. QPR player Richard Langley described the actions as "very unsporting".

Hammam stated before the game that he would provide a £30 million transfer budget if the club achieved promotion and a planned new stadium at Leckwith received approval. Hammam also called on fans of Cardiff's South Wales rivals Swansea City to support the side and described the match as "for the whole of Wales". However, Holloway refuted Hammam's call for Swansea fans to back Cardiff, calling them something "that should be in a Mills & Boon novel".

Although playing in their home city, Cardiff players stayed at the Vale of Glamorgan Hotel and Country Club the night prior to the match. Defender Andy Legg commented that the team was "a bag of nerves" beforehand but believed that the match being played in the city of Cardiff made the occasion "extra special". Striker Andy Campbell was a major doubt to feature in the match having struggled with a hernia during the season. Several days prior to the match he decided to have an operation in the hope of being fit to play and was passed fit just before kick-off to take a place on the bench. Cardiff manager Lennie Lawrence made no changes from the second-leg of their play-off semi-final against Bristol and named the same starting eleven and substitutes from the match, choosing to leave out loan player Gareth Ainsworth who missed both legs of the play-off semi-final through suspension.

== Match ==
=== Summary ===
Cardiff started the better of the two sides as Robert Earnshaw, Graham Kavanagh and Peter Thorne all had chances at goal in the opening ten minutes of the match. Kevin Gallen forced a save from Cardiff goalkeeper Neil Alexander from a free-kick soon after and a slip by Danny Gabbidon in the 26th minute allowed Paul Furlong space to shoot but he was unable to hit the target. Cardiff had the majority of possession during the first-half but strikers Earnshaw and Thorne struggled to beat QPR's central defenders Danny Shittu and Clarke Carlisle who received significant praise for their control of the game. The match remained 0–0 at half-time, both sides being described as "tense" and "nervy".

In the second half, QPR began to seize control and Gallen wasted an early chance by shooting straight at Alexander after being played through by Furlong. The pair both missed chances in the second half as QPR began to dominate the match. In the 79th minute, Cardiff manager Lennie Lawrence decided to substitute Earnshaw in place of Andy Campbell. The substitution was seen as a significant gamble by Lawrence, Earnshaw's 35 goals in all competitions during the season had broken a club record that had stood since 1927 and Campbell had not scored since January 2003. However, Cardiff's approach to the game had limited Earnshaw and Thorne's support to high passes that favoured QPR's physically larger defenders. In the final minute of the game, a misjudged header by Cardiff defender Spencer Prior fell to opposition substitute Andy Thomson but he could only direct his header wide of the goal.

After finishing 0–0 after 90 minutes, the match entered extra time. In the first half of extra time, QPR goalkeeper Chris Day produced a save to deny Prior from scoring with a header. With less than ten minutes remaining of extra time, Carlisle's forward pass was intercepted by Cardiff midfielder Gareth Whalley who played a long pass over the head of Shittu, into the path of Campbell. Hitting the ball with his left foot, Campbell lifted the ball over Day and into the net. Once the teams restarted, Cardiff defended their lead for the remaining six minutes to win the match.

=== Details ===
25 May 2003
15:00

Cardiff City	1–0 (a.e.t.)	Queens Park Rangers
Campbell 114'	(Report)

Millennium Stadium, Cardiff
Attendance: 66,096
Referee: Howard Webb

Cardiff City	Queens Park Rangers

GK	1	Neil Alexander
DF	2	Rhys Weston (substituted off) 70'
DF	6	Danny Gabbidon
DF	5	Spencer Prior
DF	23	Chris Barker
MF	12	Willie Boland
MF	8	Graham Kavanagh (c) (yellow card)
MF	4	Gareth Whalley
MF	3	Andy Legg (substituted off) 116'
FW	10	Robert Earnshaw (substituted off) 79'
FW	11	Peter Thorne
Substitutes:
GK	13	Martyn Margetson
DF	26	Gary Croft (substituted on) 70'
MF	15	Mark Bonner (substituted on) 116'
MF	14	Jason Bowen
FW	7	Andy Campbell (substituted on) 79' (yellow card)
Manager:
Lennie Lawrence

GK	1	Chris Day
DF	32	Stephen Kelly
DF	6	Danny Shittu
DF	5	Clarke Carlisle
DF	3	Gino Padula (substituted off) 79'
MF	10	Kevin Gallen
MF	8	Marc Bircham (yellow card)
MF	4	Steve Palmer (yellow card)
MF	15	Kevin McLeod
FW	24	Richard Pacquette (substituted off) 60'
FW	29	Paul Furlong (yellow card)
Substitutes:
GK	13	Nick Culkin
DF	2	Terrell Forbes
DF	33	Tom Williams (substituted on) 79'
FW	27	Andy Thomson (substituted on) 60'
FW	31	Brett Angell
Manager:
Ian Holloway

Match rules:

- 90 minutes.
- 30 minutes of extra time if necessary.
- Penalty shoot-out if scores still level.
- Five named substitutes.
- Maximum of three substitutions.

== Aftermath ==
The match attendance was recorded as 66,096. Around 8,000 seats were kept empty by organisers in order to ensure sufficient segregation between opposition fans and QPR returned around 1,000 of their 32,000 ticket allocation that were unsold. Cardiff sold out their 33,903 ticket allocation. The two clubs both received 25% of the ticket sales with the remaining half going to the Football League.

Following their victory, Cardiff manager Lawrence stated "It wasn't a classic match, but no one connected with Cardiff will ever forget it". In the ensuing celebrations, chairman Hammam was thrown into the team bath in the dressing room. The match would be defender Andy Legg's last for Cardiff as a contract dispute led to him leaving the club the following month.

Lawrence would remain with Cardiff for two further seasons in the First Division before being replaced at the end of the 2004–05 season. Cardiff would remain in the First Division (later renamed the Championship) for ten seasons before winning promotion to the Premier League in 2013.

After suffering defeat, QPR went on to win automatic promotion to the First Division the following season after finishing second behind Plymouth Argyle. Bristol City would again miss out on promotion after finishing third for the second consecutive season, finishing one point behind QPR. After achieving an 11th-placed finish in their first season, Ian Holloway left the club during the following year having been placed on gardening leave due to continued speculation linking him with a job at Leicester City. Seven years later, Holloway met Cardiff in the 2010 Football League Championship play-off final while manager of Blackpool, winning promotion to the Premier League following a 3–2 victory. QPR went on to win promotion to the Premier League in 2011.

== See also ==
- 2003 Football League play-offs
- 2003 Football League First Division play-off final
- 2003 Football League Third Division play-off final
