= 2001–02 FA Cup =

Tournament details
- Country: England; Wales

Final positions
- Champions: Arsenal (8th title)
- Runners-up: Chelsea

Tournament statistics
- Top goal scorer(s): Chris Greenacre; Tony Naylor (5 goals)

The 2001–02 FA Cup (known as the FA Cup sponsored by AXA for sponsorship reasons) was the 121st season of the world's oldest knockout football competition, the FA Cup. The competition was won by Arsenal with a 2–0 win against Chelsea, courtesy of goals from Ray Parlour and Freddie Ljungberg in the final 20 minutes of the game, completing a domestic Double for Arsenal.

== Qualifying rounds ==
All participating clubs that were not members of the Premier League or Football League entered the competition in the qualifying rounds to secure one of 32 places available in the first round proper.

The winners from the fourth qualifying round were Stalybridge Celtic, Morecambe, Northwich Victoria, Doncaster Rovers, Brigg Town, Worksop Town, Barrow, Altrincham, Southport, Lancaster City, Whitby Town, Cambridge City, Kettering Town, Tamworth, Farnborough Town, Hereford United, Worcester City, Aylesbury United, Bedford Town, Grays Athletic, Barnet, Newport County, Hayes, Welling United, Lewes, Gravesend & Northfleet, Forest Green Rovers, Aldershot Town, Tiverton Town, Hinckley United, Dagenham & Redbridge and Canvey Island.

Lewes and Hinckley United were appearing in the competition proper for the first time, although the recently merged Hinckley United was doing so for the first time in their own right after predecessor club Hinckley Athletic had last featured at this stage in 1962-63. Of the others, Newport County had last participated in the first round of the Cup in 1988-89, Bedford Town had last done so in 1981-82, Worksop Town had last done so in 1978-79, and Brigg Town had last done so back in 1881-82.

Brigg Town also became the first club to progress from the extra preliminary round to the competition proper since Linby Colliery in 1950-51 (although the extra preliminary round had been in abeyance for 50 of the intervening years). The Zebras defeated Great Harwood Town, Morpeth Town, Shildon, Gretna, Farsley Celtic and Boston United to book their place in the main draw and a first round date with Tranmere Rovers at Prenton Park.

== First round proper ==
This round is the first in which teams from the Second Division and Third Division compete with non-League teams. Matches were played 16, 17 and 18 November, with replays on 27 November and 28 November. The round included two clubs from Step 8 of English football: Brigg Town from the Northern Counties East League and Lewes from the Isthmian League Second Division.

Tie no	Home team	Score	Away team	Attendance
1	Blackpool (3)	2–2	Newport County (6)	5,005
replay	Newport County (6)	1 – 4	Blackpool (3)	3,721
2	AFC Bournemouth (3)	3–0	Worksop Town (6)	4,414
3	Barnet (5)	0–0	Carlisle United (4)	2,277
replay	Carlisle United (4)	1 – 0	Barnet (5)	1,470
4	Bristol City (3)	0–1	Leyton Orient (4)	6,343
5	Reading (3)	1–0	Welling United (6)	5,338
6	Northwich Victoria (5)	2–5	Hull City (4)	2,285
7	Macclesfield Town (4)	2–2	Forest Green Rovers (5)	1,520
replay	Forest Green Rovers (5)	1–1	Macclesfield Town (4)	1,714
Macclesfield Town won 11-10 on penalties
8	Lincoln City (4)	1–1	Bury (3)	2,925
replay	Bury (3)	1 – 1	Lincoln City (4)	2,194
Lincoln City won 3-2 on penalties
9	Swindon Town (3)	3–1	Hartlepool United (4)	4,766
10	Doncaster Rovers (5)	2–3	Scunthorpe United (4)	6,222
11	Tranmere Rovers (3)	4–1	Brigg Town (8)	
12	Kidderminster Harriers (4)	0–1	Darlington (4)	2,471
13	Brentford (3)	1–0	Morecambe (5)	4,026
14	Brighton & Hove Albion (3)	1–0	Shrewsbury Town (4)	5,450
15	Oldham Athletic (3)	1–1	Barrow (6)	5,795
replay	Barrow (6)	0 – 2	Oldham Athletic (3)	4,368
16	Worcester City (6)	0–1	Rushden & Diamonds (4)	
17	Altrincham (6)	1–1	Lancaster City (6)	2,076
replay	Lancaster City (6)	1 – 4	Altrincham (6)	
18	Southend United (4)	3–2	Luton Town (4)	
19	Exeter City (4)	3–0	Cambridge City (6)	
20	Huddersfield Town (3)	2–1	Gravesend & Northfleet (6)	6,112
21	Mansfield Town (4)	1–0	Oxford United (4)	
22	Cardiff City (3)	3–1	Tiverton Town (6)	6,638
23	Grays Athletic (6)	1–2	Hinckley United (6)	
24	Port Vale (3)	3–0	Aylesbury United (7)	
25	Halifax Town (4)	2–1	Farnborough Town (5)	
26	Stalybridge Celtic (5)	0–3	Chesterfield (3)	
27	Torquay United (4)	1–2	Northampton Town (3)	
28	Hereford United (5)	1–0	Wrexham (3)	
29	Kettering Town (6)	1–6	Cheltenham Town (4)	
30	Stoke City (3)	2–0	Lewes (8)	7,081
31	Hayes (5)	3–4	Wycombe Wanderers (3)	
32	Wigan Athletic (3)	0–1	Canvey Island (6)	
33	Tamworth (6)	1–1	Rochdale (4)	
replay	Rochdale (4)	1 – 0	Tamworth (6)	
34	Colchester United (3)	0–0	York City (4)	
replay	York City (4)	2 – 2	Colchester United (3)	
York City won 3-2 on penalties
35	Whitby Town (6)	1–1	Plymouth Argyle (4)	
replay	Plymouth Argyle (4)	3 – 2	Whitby Town (6)	
36	Cambridge United (3)	1–1	Notts County (3)	
replay	Notts County (3)	2 – 0	Cambridge United (3)	
37	Swansea City (4)	4–0	Queens Park Rangers (3)	
38	Dagenham & Redbridge (5)	1–0	Southport (5)	
39	Aldershot Town (6)	0–0	Bristol Rovers (4)	
replay	Bristol Rovers (4)	1 – 0	Aldershot Town (6)	
40	Bedford Town (6)	0–0	Peterborough United (3)	
replay	Peterborough United (3)	2 – 1	Bedford Town (6)	

== Second round proper ==
Matches were played on 8-9 December, with replays on 18-19 December. The round featured one club from each of the three competitions at Step 6 of the football pyramid: Altrincham from the Northern Premier League, Hinckley United from the Southern League and Canvey Island from the Isthmian League.

Tie no	Home team	Score	Away team	Attendance
1	Blackpool (3)	2–0	Rochdale (4)	5,191
2	Chesterfield (3)	1–1	Southend United (4)	4,522
replay	Southend United (4)	2 – 0	Chesterfield (3)	5,518
3	Canvey Island (6)	1–0	Northampton Town (3)	3,000
4	Macclesfield Town (4)	4–1	Swansea City (4)	2,025
5	Swindon Town (3)	3–2	Hereford United (5)	7,699
6	Tranmere Rovers (3)	6–1	Carlisle United (4)	7,428
7	Wycombe Wanderers (3)	3–0	Notts County (3)	4,725
8	Brighton & Hove Albion (3)	2–1	Rushden & Diamonds (4)	5,647
9	Plymouth Argyle (4)	1–1	Bristol Rovers (4)	6,141
replay	Bristol Rovers (4)	3 – 2	Plymouth Argyle (4)	5,763
10	Hull City (4)	2–3	Oldham Athletic (3)	9,422
11	Altrincham (6)	1–2	Darlington (4)	3,302
12	Exeter City (4)	0–0	Dagenham & Redbridge (5)	4,082
replay	Dagenham & Redbridge (5)	3 – 0	Exeter City (4)	2,660
13	Scunthorpe United (4)	3–2	Brentford (3)	3,457
14	Mansfield Town (4)	4–0	Huddersfield Town (3)	6,836
15	Cardiff City (3)	3–0	Port Vale (3)	9,650
16	Halifax Town (4)	1–1	Stoke City (3)	3,335
replay	Stoke City (3)	3 – 0	Halifax Town (4)	4,356
17	York City (4)	2–0	Reading (3)	3,161
18	Peterborough United (3)	1–0	AFC Bournemouth (3)	4,773
19	Leyton Orient (4)	2–1	Lincoln City (4)	4,195
20	Hinckley United (6)	0–2	Cheltenham Town (4)	2,661

== Third round proper ==
This round marked the first time First Division and Premier League (top-flight) teams played. Matches played 5 January and 6 January, replays on 15 January and 16 January. Canvey Island was again the lowest-ranked team in the round - along with Football Conference (Step 5) side Dagenham & Redbridge they were also the last non-league clubs left in the competition.

Tie no	Home team	Score	Away team	Attendance
1	Darlington (4)	2–2	Peterborough United (3)	10,892
replay	Peterborough United (3)	2 – 0	Darlington (4)	
2	Burnley (2)	4–1	Canvey Island (6)	11,496
3	Liverpool (1)	3–0	Birmingham City (2)	40,875
4	Watford (2)	2–4	Arsenal (1)	20,105
5	Walsall (2)	2–0	Bradford City (2)	
6	Leicester City (1)	2–1	Mansfield Town (4)	
7	Aston Villa (1)	2–3	Manchester United (1)	38,444
8	Grimsby Town (2)	0–0	York City (4)	
replay	York City (4)	1 – 0	Grimsby Town (2)	
9	Macclesfield Town (4)	0–3	West Ham United (1)	
10	Wolverhampton Wanderers (2)	0–1	Gillingham (2)	15,271
11	Crewe Alexandra (2)	2–1	Sheffield Wednesday (2)	
12	Sunderland (1)	1–2	West Bromwich Albion (2)	29,133
13	Derby County (1)	1–3	Bristol Rovers (4)	18,549
14	Sheffield United (2)	1–0	Nottingham Forest (2)	14,696
15	Stockport County (2)	1–4	Bolton Wanderers (1)	5,821
16	Newcastle United (1)	2–0	Crystal Palace (2)	
17	Wycombe Wanderers (3)	2–2	Fulham (1)	
replay	Fulham (1)	1 – 0	Wycombe Wanderers (3)	
18	Manchester City (2)	2–0	Swindon Town (3)	
19	Barnsley (2)	1–1	Blackburn Rovers (1)	
replay	Blackburn Rovers (1)	3 – 1	Barnsley (2)	
20	Coventry City (2)	0–2	Tottenham Hotspur (1)	20,758
21	Portsmouth (2)	1–4	Leyton Orient (4)	
22	Brighton & Hove Albion (3)	0–2	Preston North End (2)	6,548
23	Norwich City (2)	0–0	Chelsea (1)	21,017
replay	Chelsea (1)	4 – 0	Norwich City (2)	24,231
24	Millwall (2)	2–1	Scunthorpe United (4)	
25	Wimbledon (2)	0–0	Middlesbrough (1)	
replay	Middlesbrough (1)	2–0	Wimbledon (2)	
26	Southend United (4)	1–3	Tranmere Rovers (3)	
27	Cardiff City (3)	2–1	Leeds United (1)	22,009
28	Charlton Athletic (1)	2–1	Blackpool (3)	
29	Cheltenham Town (4)	2–1	Oldham Athletic (3)	5,801
30	Stoke City (3)	0–1	Everton (1)	28,218
31	Rotherham United (2)	2–1	Southampton (1)	
32	Dagenham & Redbridge (5)	1–4	Ipswich Town (1)	

== Fourth round proper ==
Matches were played on the weekend beginning 26 January, with the Chelsea-West Ham replay held on 6 February. Four Third Division clubs in Bristol Rovers, Leyton Orient, Cheltenham Town and York City were the lowest-ranked teams in the draw.

The Arsenal-Liverpool tie was a rematch of the previous year's final.

Tie no	Home team	Score	Away team	Attendance
1	Preston North End (2)	2–1	Sheffield United (2)	13,068
2	Gillingham (2)	1–0	Bristol Rovers (4)	
3	Middlesbrough (1)	2–0	Manchester United (1)	
4	West Bromwich Albion (2)	1–0	Leicester City (1)	26,860
5	Everton (1)	4–1	Leyton Orient (4)	
6	Ipswich Town (1)	1–4	Manchester City (2)	
7	Tranmere Rovers (3)	3–1	Cardiff City (3)	
8	Tottenham Hotspur (1)	4–0	Bolton Wanderers (1)	
9	Millwall (2)	0–1	Blackburn Rovers (1)	
10	Chelsea (1)	1–1	West Ham United (1)	33,443
replay	West Ham United (1)	2–3	Chelsea (1)	27,272
11	Charlton Athletic (1)	1–2	Walsall (2)	
12	Arsenal (1)	1–0	Liverpool (1)	38,092
13	Cheltenham Town (4)	2–1	Burnley (2)	7,300
14	York City (4)	0–2	Fulham (1)	
15	Rotherham United (2)	2–4	Crewe Alexandra (2)	
16	Peterborough United (3)	2–4	Newcastle United (1)	

== Fifth round proper ==
Matches played on the weekend of 16 February and 17 February, with the replay on 26 February.

West Bromwich Albion were the only non-Premiership side to progress to the last eight, at the expense of Cheltenham Town – the last remaining Division Three side in the competition.

Tie no	Home team	Score	Away team	Attendance
1	Walsall (2)	1–2	Fulham (1)	
2	Middlesbrough (1)	1–0	Blackburn Rovers (1)	
3	West Bromwich Albion (2)	1–0	Cheltenham Town (4)	27,179
4	Everton (1)	0–0	Crewe Alexandra (2)	
replay	Crewe Alexandra (2)	1–2	Everton (1)	
5	Newcastle United (1)	1–0	Manchester City (2)	
6	Tottenham Hotspur (1)	4–0	Tranmere Rovers (3)	
7	Chelsea (1)	3–1	Preston North End (2)	28,133
8	Arsenal (1)	5–2	Gillingham (2)	

== Sixth round proper ==
Matches were played on the weekend of 9 March, with the replay on 23 March.

West Bromwich Albion were the last non-Premiership side remaining in the competition, and their hopes of further progression were ended when they lost the quarter-final tie at home to Fulham.

9 March 2002
17:35

Newcastle United (1)	1–1	Arsenal (1)
Robert 52'	Report	Edu 14'

St. James' Park, Newcastle
Attendance: 51,027
Referee: Mark Halsey

10 March 2002
13:00

Middlesbrough (1)	3–0	Everton (1)
Whelan 35'; Németh 37'; Ince 42'	Report

Riverside Stadium, Middlesbrough
Attendance: 26,950
Referee: Alan Wiley

10 March 2002
16:00

Tottenham Hotspur (1)	0–4	Chelsea (1)
	Report	Gallas 12'; Guðjohnsen 48', 66'; Le Saux 54'

White Hart Lane, London
Attendance: 32,896
Referee: Andy D'Urso

10 March 2002
18:30

West Bromwich Albion (2)	0–1	Fulham (1)
	Report	Marlet 47'

The Hawthorns, West Bromwich
Attendance: 24,811
Referee: Neale Barry

=== Replay ===
23 March 2002
12:00

Arsenal (1)	3–0	Newcastle United (1)
Pires 2'; Bergkamp 9'; Campbell 50'	Report

Arsenal Stadium, London
Attendance: 38,073
Referee: Uriah Rennie

== Semi-finals ==
Matches played at a neutral venue on April 14, 2002.

Gianluca Festa, who had been on the losing side for Middlesbrough in both the FA Cup and League Cup finals five years earlier, endured further misfortune when he scored an own goal that ended his side's hopes of FA Cup glory and handed the initiative to Arsenal.

Fulham, who were playing their first top division season for more than 30 years, had been hoping to compensate for a disappointing Premier League campaign with glory in the FA Cup. These hopes were ended by their neighbours Chelsea, who won the semi-final tie 1–0.

14 April 2002
19:00 BST

Fulham (1)	0–1	Chelsea (1)
	Report	Terry 42'

Villa Park, Birmingham
Attendance: 36,147
Referee: Graham Poll

14 April 2002
16:00 BST

Middlesbrough (1)	0–1	Arsenal (1)
	Report	Festa 39' (o.g.)

Old Trafford, Manchester
Attendance: 61,168
Referee: David Elleray

== Final ==
Arsenal's 2–0 victory set them up for a third double (which was completed when they sealed the league title four days later) and saw them equal Tottenham's eight FA Cup triumphs – putting them second only to Manchester United (10 trophies) as the most frequent winners of the FA Cup.

4 May 2002
15:00 BST

Arsenal	2–0	Chelsea
Parlour 70'; Ljungberg 80'	Report

Millennium Stadium, Cardiff
Attendance: 73,963
Referee: Mike Riley (West Yorkshire)

== Media coverage ==
In the United Kingdom, the BBC were the free to air broadcasters taking over from ITV who had it after four years while Sky Sports were the subscription broadcasters for the fourteenth consecutive season.

The BBC had a much-expanded rights package compared to previous terrestrial networks, showing live games from the first two rounds and multiple live matches from rounds 3 to 6. This meant two BBC live matches on a Sunday and matches being played at 7pm on a Sunday evening, which was not popular with travelling supporters and was discontinued after the fifth round; the quarter-final between Newcastle and Arsenal was the first FA Cup match other than finals to be shown live by the BBC on a Saturday.

The live matches shown on the BBC were:

- Hereford United 1-0 Wrexham (R1)
- Canvey Island 1-0 Northampton Town (R2)
- Macclesfield Town 0-3 West Ham United (R3)
- Aston Villa 2-3 Manchester United (R3)
- Arsenal 1-0 Liverpool (R4)
- Ipswich Town 1-4 Manchester City (R4)
- Everton 0-0 Crewe Alexandra (R5)
- Newcastle United 1-0 Manchester City (R5)
- Newcastle United 1-1 Arsenal (QF)
- Middlesbrough 3-0 Everton (QF)
- Fulham 0-1 Chelsea (SF)
- Arsenal 2-0 Chelsea (Final)

The live matches shown on Sky Sports were:

- Hayes 3-4 Wycombe Wanderers (R1)
- Swansea City 4-0 Queen's Park Rangers (R1)
- Newport County 1-4 Blackpool (R1 Replay)
- Brighton & Hove Albion 2-1 Rushden & Diamonds (R2)
- Exeter City 0-0 Dagenham & Redbridge (R2)
- Dagenham & Redbridge 3-0 Exeter City (R2 Replay)
- Watford 2-4 Arsenal (R3)
- Cardiff City 2-1 Leeds United (R3)
- Chelsea 4-0 Norwich City (R3 Replay)
- Middlesbrough 2-0 Manchester United (R4)
- Peterborough United 2-4 Newcastle United (R4)
- West Ham United 2-3 Chelsea (R4 Replay)
- Walsall 1-2 Fulham (R5)
- Chelsea 3-1 Preston North End (R5)
- Crewe Alexandra 1-2 Everton (R5 Replay)
- Tottenham Hotspur 0-4 Chelsea (QF)
- West Bromwich Albion 0-1 Fulham (QF)
- Arsenal 3-0 Newcastle United (QF Replay)
- Middlesbrough 0-1 Arsenal (SF)
- Arsenal 2-0 Chelsea (Final)
