= Neil Alexander =

Scottish association football player (born 1978)

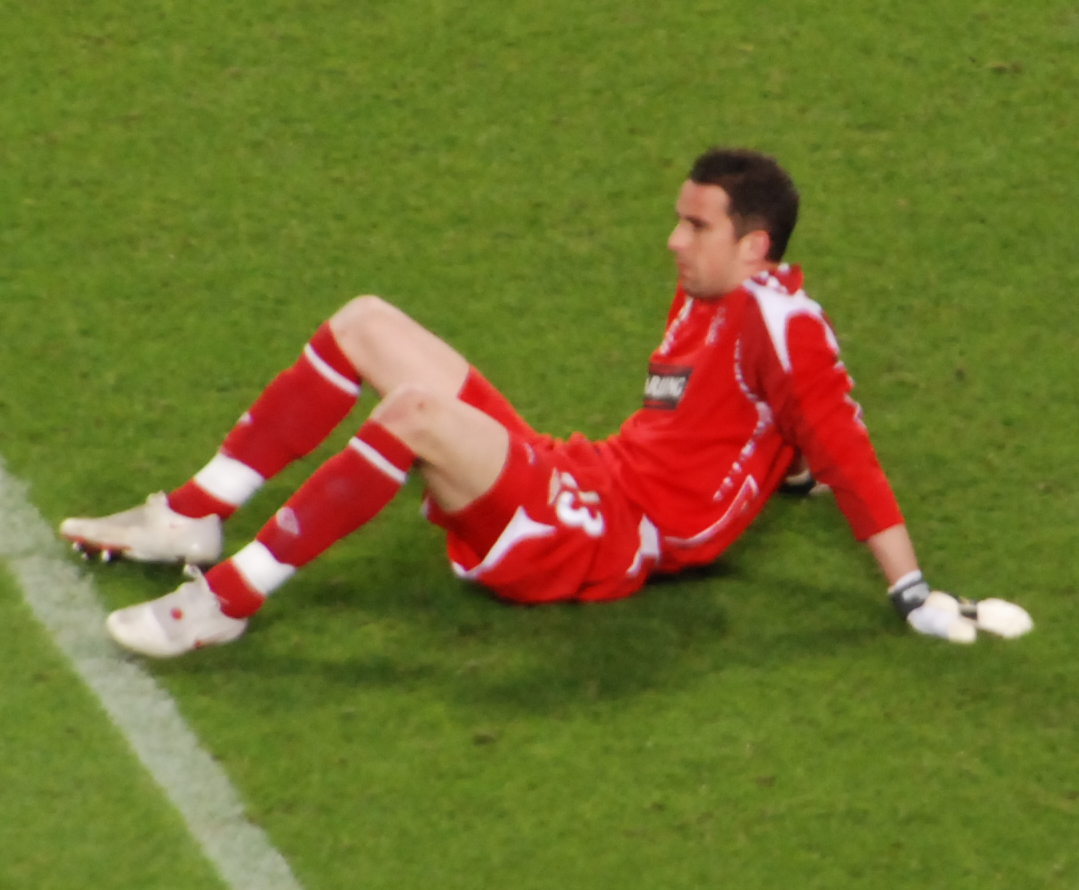
- Alexander with Rangers in the 2008 UEFA Cup Final

Personal information
- Full name: James Neil Alexander
- Date of birth: 10 March 1978 (age 48)
- Place of birth: Edinburgh, Scotland
- Height: 1.85 m (6 ft 1 in)
- Position: Goalkeeper

Youth career
- Edina Hibs

Senior career*
| Years | Team | Apps | (Gls) |
| 1996–1998 | Stenhousemuir | 41 | (0) |
| 1998–2001 | Livingston | 60 | (0) |
| 2001–2007 | Cardiff City | 213 | (0) |
| 2007–2008 | Ipswich Town | 29 | (0) |
| 2008–2013 | Rangers | 61 | (0) |
| 2013–2014 | Crystal Palace | 1 | (0) |
| 2014–2016 | Heart of Midlothian | 64 | (0) |
| 2016–2017 | Aberdeen | 0 | (0) |
| 2017–2018 | Livingston | 34 | (0) |
| 2022 | Dunfermline Athletic | 0 | (0) |
| Total | | 502 | (0) |

International career
| 1997–1999 | Scotland U21 | 10 | (0) |
| 2003 | Scotland B | 1 | (0) |
| 2006 | Scotland | 3 | (0) |
- * Club domestic league appearances and goals as of 15:31, 5 March 2022 (UTC)

James Neil Alexander (born 10 March 1978) is a Scottish football coach and former professional player. He began his career in the Scottish Football League with spells at Stenhousemuir and Livingston, before joining Cardiff City in May 2001 for a fee of £130,000. At Ninian Park, he went on to make over 200 appearances in all competitions during a six-year spell at the club, helping them achieve promotion to the Football League First Division via the 2003 Football League Second Division play-off final. A contract dispute with the club led to a free transfer to fellow Football League Championship side Ipswich Town in 2007.

After six months at Portman Road, he returned to Scotland with Rangers. Alexander was primarily understudy to Allan McGregor, but won the Scottish Cup twice, the Scottish League Cup three times and played in the 2008 UEFA Cup Final. He became the first choice goalkeeper for Rangers after McGregor left the club following Rangers entering administration and subsequent liquidation in 2012. Alexander left Rangers in 2013 after a dispute over wages, having won the Scottish Third Division title at the first attempt, to join Premier League side Crystal Palace. He made one appearance for Palace during the 2013–14 season, in the Football League Cup, before being released.

He returned to Scotland for a third time following the expiration of his contract at Palace with Heart of Midlothian. In his first season with the club, he helped them win the Scottish Championship title, returning to the Scottish Premiership after one season and remained first choice the following season, as they achieved a third-place finish in the top division. Alexander was released by Hearts in 2016 and then spent a year as a backup at Aberdeen. He then returned to Livingston in 2017, and helped them win promotion in his final season as a player.

Alexander represented Scotland at under-21 and B levels and gained three caps at full international level in 2006, winning the Kirin Cup.

After retiring as a player, Alexander was goalkeeping coach of Dundee United from 2018 to 2021. In March 2022 Alexander joined Dunfermline Athletic as goalkeeping coach following the departure of Owain Fon Williams. Dunfermline also registered Alexander as a player for the remainder of the season and he immediately went into the match day squad as substitute goalkeeper. In 2022, Alexander became goalkeeping coach at Motherwell F.C.

== Early life ==
Born in Edinburgh, Alexander grew up as a fan of Heart of Midlothian and idolised striker John Robertson, despite his father Jim being a fan of their Edinburgh rivals Hibernian. As a teenager, Alexander attended Balerno Community High School.

== Club career ==
=== Early career ===
Alexander started his career with local youth side Edina Hibs in Niddrie, Edinburgh and attracted interest from Arbroath, agreeing scholarship terms with the club. However, at the age of 18, Alexander was spotted by Stenhousemuir manager Terry Christie while playing for Edina. Christie had initially gone to watch the side play at a public park with his son after the team coach Bill Harper recommended one of the sides defenders to him but instead spotted Alexander and immediately signed him for Stenhousemuir, despite not knowing his name at the time. Christie later remarked "You could see the talent he (Alexander) had in that one game. He was streets ahead of everyone else". After establishing himself in the first-team for two seasons, he moved to Livingston in 1998, where he was part of Scottish Second Division and Scottish First Division title-winning sides during a three-year spell. During his time at the club, Alexander attracted attention from various British clubs including Everton and old firm duo Rangers and Celtic.

=== Cardiff City ===
On 28 May 2001, he joined Football League Second Division side Cardiff City for a nominal fee of £130,000, with chairman Sam Hammam stating his belief that Alexander had the potential to play at international level in the future. The club had been rejected on several occasions prior to this when attempting to sign a new goalkeeper, failing in bids to sign Andy Marriott, Stewart Kerr and Jamie Langfield, and had originally traveled to watch his Livingston teammate Ian McCaldon, even preparing a bid for the player, but discovered that Alexander was soon to be out of contract and could be signed for a much lower price. He made his debut for the club on the opening day of the 2001–02 season, keeping a clean sheet during a 1–0 victory over Wycombe Wanderers. At the time of his arrival, chairman Hammam's investment had seen the club rise from the Third Division to pushing for promotion to the First Division in four years and Alexander remained ever present in league competition during his first season as the club were eliminated in the play-off semi-final by Stoke City. Following his first season, Alexander stated that his aims were "to be Cardiff City's regular goalkeeper and Scotland's number one."

After suffering a play-off defeat during his first season at Ninian Park, in Alexander's second, Cardiff again reached the play-offs, meeting Severnside rivals Bristol City. Alexander kept clean sheets in both legs of the play-off semi-final, making his 100th appearance in all competitions for the Bluebirds during the second leg, earning plaudits for his performances which were described as "faultless". The club went on to achieve promotion by winning the 2003 Football League Second Division play-off final against Queens Park Rangers following Andy Campbell's extra-time winner. During his time at Cardiff, Alexander became a fan favourite, despite nearly leaving the club midway through his six-year spell after falling behind Martyn Margetson and Tony Warner following their promotion to the First Division under manager Lennie Lawrence. However, he later regained his position in the first-team and was ever present for the club during the 2005–06 season, playing in all 46 league matches, which lead to him being awarded the club's most improved player award.

During the 2006–07 season he became embroiled in a contract dispute with the club over a wage increase which left him refusing to sign a new contract. Following the club's refusal to offer Alexander an improved deal toward the end of the 2006–07 season, Alexander admitted that he had accepted his inevitable departure from the club, stating "I've got used to the fact now that I'm leaving, but I would have loved to have stayed" and commented that it would be a "sad day" when he leaves Cardiff for the final time. Cardiff manager Dave Jones replaced Alexander as first choice for the last two months of the season with David Forde, his final appearance for Cardiff coming on 31 March in a 1–0 defeat to Sunderland. In six years at Ninian Park, he played over 200 games for the Bluebirds and at the time of his departure he was the longest serving player at the club.

=== Ipswich Town ===
After attracting interest from a number of sides, on 16 July 2007, he signed with rival Championship side Ipswich Town. On his arrival at Portman Road, Alexander immediately became first choice goalkeeper at the club and made his debut in a 4–1 win against Sheffield Wednesday on 11 August 2007 in the opening match of the 2007–08 season. In January 2008, after six months with the Tractor Boys, the club accepted a bid from Scottish side Rangers and gave Alexander permission to open talks with the club. Ipswich manager Jim Magilton stated that it had been difficult for Alexander's family to settle in the area since he joined Ipswich and that the move was beneficial to Alexander's hopes of breaking into the Scotland national side, adding that he felt the club could not "stand in his way" over a potential transfer. His final appearance for the club came on 29 January 2008 in a 0–0 draw with Plymouth Argyle, during which he saved a penalty from Steven MacLean to keep a clean sheet. During his six-month spell at Portman Road, Alexander made 31 appearances in all competitions and had been ever present in the league prior to his departure.

=== Rangers ===
On 30 January 2008, Rangers agreed a deal with Alexander and he signed a three-and-a-half-year contract later that day. The transfer was believed to be a free transfer with potential add-ons related to success, although it was officially undisclosed. Alexander made his debut for Rangers on 3 February 2008, coming on as a substitute after Allan McGregor had been sent off in a Scottish Cup tie at Hibernian. On 16 April, Alexander made his Old Firm debut as a 77th-minute substitute for the injured McGregor. Toward the end of the season, he played a vital role in Rangers' UEFA Cup and Scottish Cup semi-final wins, keeping clean sheets in both legs of their UEFA Cup victory over Italian side Fiorentina, where he made important saves when both games were decided by penalty shoot-outs. With McGregor injured, Alexander remained in place for the 2008 UEFA Cup Final against Zenit Saint Petersburg but was unable to prevent a 2–0 defeat. Despite the defeat, Alexander did collect some silverware in his first year at Ibrox, playing in the 2008 Scottish Cup Final as Rangers defeated Queen of the South 3–2 at Hampden Park.

However, after two seasons as understudy to McGregor, Alexander began to grow frustrated at the lack of playing time and publicly stated that he would consider quitting the club if he was not able to establish himself as the club's first choice. Five months later, Alexander was promoted to first choice keeper at Rangers in April 2009, after McGregor was suspended for a late night drinking session, alongside then Rangers and Scotland captain Barry Ferguson. Alexander remained in goal until the end of the season, finishing the season with eleven league appearances and helping to clinch a league and cup double. The following season, McGregor returned to first choice goalkeeper despite Rangers manager Walter Smith stating that the decision was "unfair" on Alexander following his performances. However, Alexander played in all matches of the successful 2009–10 Scottish League Cup campaign, including the final against St Mirren.

In a pre-season testimonial game for Queen of the South's Jim Thomson prior to the 2010–11 season, Alexander came on at half time as a substitute for Queens despite being on the Rangers bench after goalkeeper Roddy McKenzie suffered an injury. Alexander continued as second choice keeper in the 2010–11 season, but signed a new contract with the club. He took the decision to extend his stay at the club despite admitting that his decision to remain as second choice would end his hopes of any further international call-ups. During the 2010–11 season, he played in one league match and four League Cup ties for Rangers and won his third League Cup honour with Rangers on 20 March 2011, in a 2–1 extra time win over Old Firm rivals Celtic in the final.

==== First-team and departure ====
Rangers entered administration and were subsequently liquidated in 2012. Charles Green purchased the business and assets of Rangers, including player contracts, from the administrator. Alexander was one of three senior players who agreed to have his contract switched to Green's company, and was one of 13 players who turned up for the club's first training session following the sale. Allan McGregor refused to transfer his contract, which meant that Alexander became first choice 'keeper at Rangers as they embarked on a campaign in the fourth tier of the Scottish football league system. Alexander later commented that he did not see himself as a "Third Division player" but had decided to remain with the club for the "chance to be number one at such a massive club." He remained ever present through the 2012–13 league campaign for Rangers as the club dominated the Third Division, winning the league title by 24 points from second place Peterhead.

Alexander left Rangers at the end of the 2012–13 season despite expressing his desire to remain at the club. Although he accepted the need to take a pay cut due to the club's financial troubles, he was unhappy with the amount that was offered to him, commenting "I was desperate to stay but the contract offer was just not acceptable. I deserved better." Alexander had been hoping for a two-year extension with the club, similar to a deal given to club captain Lee McCulloch, but was offered a one-year deal at Ibrox and on less than a third of the original £10,000 a week wage offered by the club. After rejecting the deal, Rangers confirmed the pre-contract signing of Cammy Bell as his replacement. Manager Ally McCoist and goalkeeping coach Jim Stewart both tried to convince Alexander to stay with the club.

Following his departure, Alexander began legal proceedings against Rangers for a breach of contract. He claimed that he had been denied a wage increase and an improved appearance bonus that had been promised if he became first choice goalkeeper. Alexander won his case and was awarded £84,000 in compensation. After the court case, Alexander claimed that he had received "sickening abuse" from Rangers fans when he returned to the club as a Hearts player.

=== Crystal Palace ===
After leaving Rangers in the summer, Alexander found it difficult to find a new club and commented that it was a "tough summer". He eventually signed for newly promoted Premier League side Crystal Palace on an initial one-year deal on 14 August 2013, as understudy to Julián Speroni. He had been recommended to manager Ian Holloway by goalkeeping coach George Wood who had previously coached Alexander at Cardiff City. He made his debut in a 2–1 League Cup defeat against Bristol City on 27 August 2013 that was his only appearance for the club during the 2013–14 season and he was released by Palace on 1 July 2014 following the expiration of his contract.

=== Heart of Midlothian ===
In June 2014, Alexander signed for Heart of Midlothian, the club he supported as a boy, following their relegation to the Scottish Championship at the end of the 2013–14 season in a dual role as a player-coach, eventually completing the transfer on 1 July following the expiration of his contract at Crystal Palace. Alexander commented on his delight at signing for his boyhood club, stating "When the phonecall came, I was delighted. I didn't have to think twice. It's fantastic, I'm just proud to be here.". He made his debut for the club on 26 July 2014 in a 3–1 victory over Annan Athletic in the Scottish Challenge Cup alongside a number of other debutants as manager Robbie Neilson reshaped his squad for the upcoming season. Alexander made his league debut for the club in their following match on the opening day of the 2014–15 Scottish Championship season during a 2–1 win against his former club Rangers but suffered an injury an hour into the match after a collision with teammate Alim Ozturk. He was replaced by substitute Scott Gallacher and traveled to a local hospital where it was confirmed that Alexander had suffered a broken cheekbone and was subsequently kept out of action for a month, making his return in a 0–0 draw with Dumbarton on 13 September. He went on to make 29 league appearances during the 2014–15 season, as Hearts won the Scottish Championship and promotion back to the top tier of the Scottish football league system at the first time of asking.

Alexander continued to be the regular goalkeeper the following year, during the 2015–16 season, as Hearts finished third in the Scottish Premiership. Despite initially opening talks over an extension to his contract and negotiating over a deal for nearly six months, the club then decided to release Alexander at the end of his contract. Alexander admitted that, having been established as the club's first choice goalkeeper for two seasons, it came as a shock when manager Robbie Neilson informed him that the club would not be offering him a new deal and commented that there was "no loyalty in football". Neilson later revealed that he took the decision to release Alexander as he felt that his highly rated understudy Jack Hamilton was ready to take over as the club's first choice goalkeeper.

=== Aberdeen ===
Alexander signed a one-year contract with Aberdeen in June 2016, joining alongside fellow goalkeeper Joe Lewis. Lewis began the season as the club's first-choice goalkeeper and his form saw Alexander remain as backup during the campaign. He chose to remain living in Glasgow, travelling to Aberdeen each day for training and matches. However, he expressed his frustration at his lack of playing time stating the move had "not worked out the way I thought it would" although." In March 2017, Aberdeen manager Derek McInnes confirmed that Alexander would not be offered an extension to his contract and he left the club at the end of the season without making a first-team appearance.

=== Livingston ===
Alexander signed for Livingston in July 2017, returning to the club 16 years after he left for Cardiff City. He joined the club "to play matches, to see out my career" and made his second debut in a 1–1 draw with Partick Thistle in the Scottish League Cup. The draw resulted in a penalty shootout with Alexander saving three opposition penalties to win the tie for his side. The match was his first competitive appearance since April 2016. He helped the club gain promotion via the Scottish Championship play-offs after defeating Partick Thistle, making 47 appearances in all competitions.

== International career ==
Having represented Scotland at under-21 level on ten occasions, Alexander was first called up for Scotland at the age of 24 during the summer 2002 Far East tour but did not receive a cap. He was called up a second time in August 2002 for a UEFA Euro 2004 qualifying group match against Faroe Islands after Neil Sullivan was forced to withdraw due to injury. He remained a regular call-up for Scotland squads for several years before eventually making his Scotland debut as a 49th-minute substitute in place of Craig Gordon during a 3–1 defeat to Switzerland on 1 March 2006 in a friendly match, a cap which his Cardiff manager Dave Jones described as "deserved". Alexander also played a part in Scotland's 2006 Kirin Cup win and played both matches against Bulgaria and Japan.

== Coaching career ==
Alexander retired from playing in June 2018, and was appointed goalkeeping coach at Dundee United. He left the club in July 2021. In March 2022 Alexander joined John Hughes's Dunfermline Athletic backroom team as goalkeeping coach following the departure of Owain Fon Williams. Due to injuries, Dunfermline registered Alexander as a player for the remainder of the season and he immediately went in to the match day squad versus Arbroath as a substitute. In 2022, Alexander became goalkeeping coach at Motherwell F.C.

== Career statistics ==
=== Club ===
Appearances and goals by club, season and competition
| Club | Season | League | | | National Cup | | League Cup | | Other | | Total | |
| Club | Season | Division | Apps | Goals | Apps | Goals | Apps | Goals | Apps | Goals | Apps | Goals |
|---|---|---|---|---|---|---|---|---|---|---|---|---|
| Stenhousemuir | 1996–97 | Scottish Second Division | 5 | 0 | 0 | 0 | 0 | 0 | 1 | 0 | 6 | 0 |
| Stenhousemuir | 1997–98 | Scottish Second Division | 36 | 0 | 1 | 0 | 1 | 0 | 1 | 0 | 39 | 0 |
| Stenhousemuir | Total | | 41 | 0 | 1 | 0 | 1 | 0 | 2 | 0 | 45 | 0 |
| Livingston | 1998–99 | Scottish Second Division | 21 | 0 | 5 | 0 | 0 | 0 | 0 | 0 | 26 | 0 |
| Livingston | 1999–2000 | Scottish First Division | 13 | 0 | 0 | 0 | 0 | 0 | 0 | 0 | 13 | 0 |
| Livingston | 2000–01 | Scottish First Division | 26 | 0 | 3 | 0 | 2 | 0 | 5 | 0 | 36 | 0 |
| Livingston | Total | | 60 | 0 | 8 | 0 | 2 | 0 | 5 | 0 | 75 | 0 |
| Cardiff City | 2001–02 | Second Division | 46 | 0 | 4 | 0 | 1 | 0 | 2 (Note: Appearances in Second Division play-offs) | 0 | 53 | 0 |
| Cardiff City | 2002–03 | Second Division | 40 | 0 | 4 | 0 | 1 | 0 | 3 | 0 | 48 | 0 |
| Cardiff City | 2003–04 | First Division | 25 | 0 | 0 | 0 | 0 | 0 | - | - | 25 | 0 |
| Cardiff City | 2004–05 | Championship | 17 | 0 | 0 | 0 | 2 | 0 | - | - | 19 | 0 |
| Cardiff City | 2005–06 | Championship | 46 | 0 | 1 | 0 | 1 | 0 | - | - | 48 | 0 |
| Cardiff City | 2006–07 | Championship | 39 | 0 | 2 | 0 | 0 | 0 | - | - | 41 | 0 |
| Cardiff City | Total | | 213 | 0 | 11 | 0 | 5 | 0 | 5 | 0 | 234 | 0 |
| Ipswich Town | 2007–08 | Championship | 29 | 0 | 1 | 0 | 1 | 0 | - | - | 31 | 0 |
| Rangers | 2007–08 | Scottish Premier League | 8 | 0 | 4 | 0 | 0 | 0 | 3 (Note: Appearances in UEFA Cup) | 0 | 15 | 0 |
| Rangers | 2008–09 | Scottish Premier League | 11 | 0 | 2 | 0 | 1 | 0 | 0 | 0 | 14 | 0 |
| Rangers | 2009–10 | Scottish Premier League | 5 | 0 | 0 | 0 | 4 | 0 | 0 | 0 | 9 | 0 |
| Rangers | 2010–11 | Scottish Premier League | 1 | 0 | 0 | 0 | 4 | 0 | 2 (Note: Appearances in Europa League) | 0 | 7 | 0 |
| Rangers | 2011–12 | Scottish Premier League | 1 | 0 | 0 | 0 | 1 | 0 | 0 | 0 | 2 | 0 |
| Rangers | 2012–13 | Scottish Third Division | 36 | 0 | 4 | 0 | 4 | 0 | 3 (Note: Appearances in Scottish Challenge Cup) | 0 | 47 | 0 |
| Rangers | Total | | 62 | 0 | 10 | 0 | 14 | 0 | 8 | 0 | 94 | 0 |
| Crystal Palace | 2013–14 | Premier League | 0 | 0 | 0 | 0 | 1 | 0 | - | - | 1 | 0 |
| Heart of Midlothian | 2014–15 | Scottish Championship | 29 | 0 | 1 | 0 | 1 | 0 | 1 | 0 | 32 | 0 |
| Heart of Midlothian | 2015–16 | Scottish Premiership | 35 | 0 | 3 | 0 | 2 | 0 | - | - | 40 | 0 |
| Heart of Midlothian | Total | | 64 | 0 | 4 | 0 | 3 | 0 | 1 | 0 | 72 | 0 |
| Aberdeen | 2016–17 | Scottish Premiership | 0 | 0 | 0 | 0 | 0 | 0 | 0 | 0 | 0 | 0 |
| Livingston | 2017–18 | Scottish Championship | 34 | 0 | 1 | 0 | 6 | 0 | 6 (Note: Appearances in Scottish Challenge Cup and Scottish Championship play-offs) | 0 | 47 | 0 |
| Dunfermline Athletic | 2021–22 | Scottish Championship | 0 | 0 | 0 | 0 | 0 | 0 | 0 | 0 | 0 | 0 |
| Career total | | | 505 | 0 | 36 | 0 | 33 | 0 | 25 | 0 | 597 | 0 |

=== International ===
Appearances and goals by national team and year
| National team | Year | Apps | Goals |
|---|---|---|---|
| Scotland | 2006 | 3 | 0 |
| Total | | 3 | 0 |

== Honours ==
Livingston

- Scottish First Division: 2000–01
- Scottish Second Division: 1998–99

Cardiff City

- Football League Second Division play-offs: 2003

Rangers

- Scottish Premiership: 2008–09, 2009–10, 2010–11
- Scottish Third Division: 2012–13
- Scottish Cup: 2007–08, 2008–09
- Scottish League Cup: 2007–08, 2009–10, 2010–11
- UEFA Cup runner-up: 2007–08

Heart of Midlothian

- Scottish Championship: 2014–15

Scotland

- Kirin Cup: 2006

Individual

- PFA Scotland Team of the Year: 2014–15 Championship, 2017–18 Championship
