= Scott Young (Welsh footballer) =

Welsh footballer

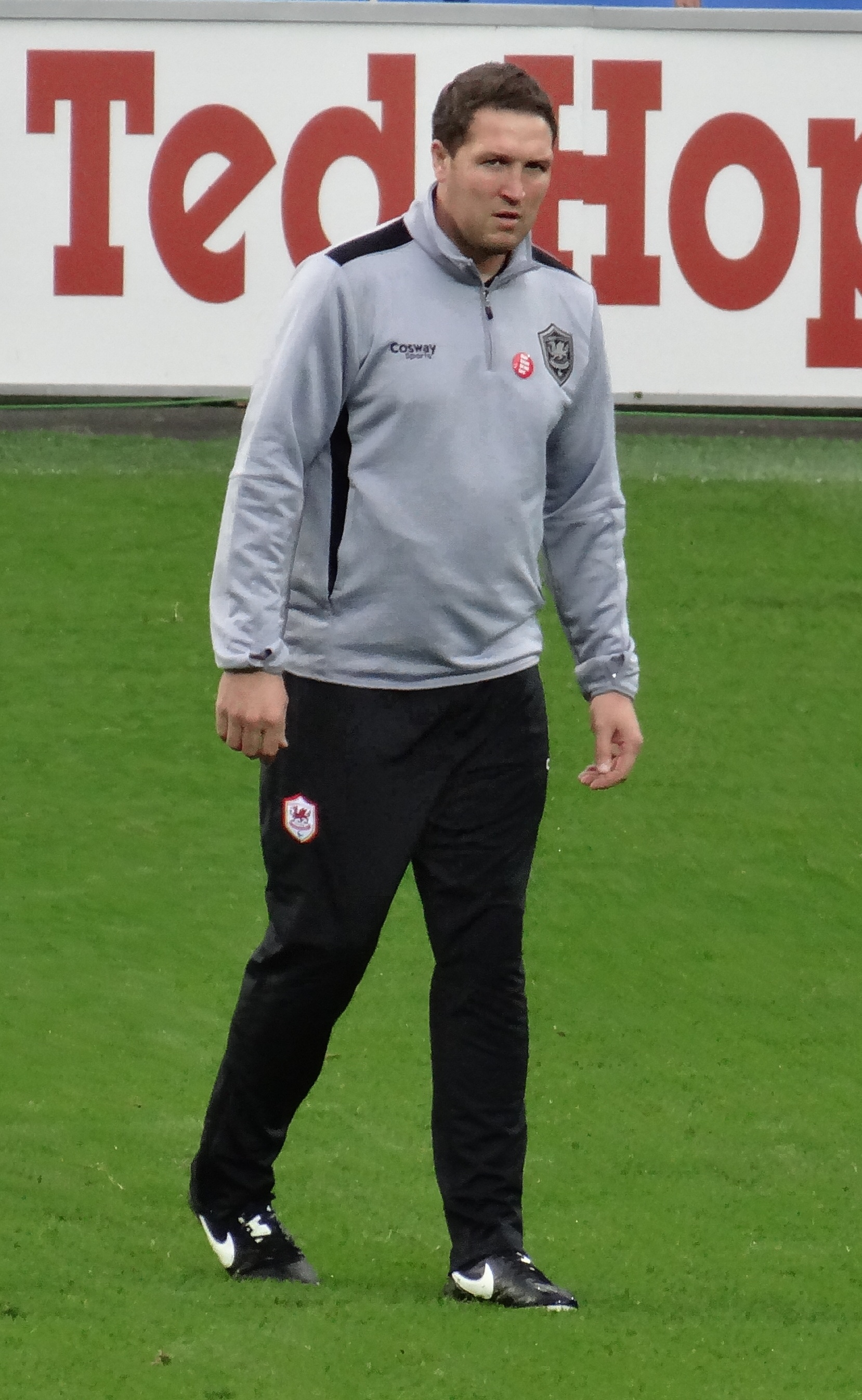
- Young in 2014.

Personal information
- Full name: Scott Young
- Date of birth: 14 January 1976 (age 50)
- Place of birth: Tonypandy, Wales
- Position: Defender

Youth career
- Cardiff City

Senior career*
Years	Team	Apps	(Gls)
1993–2004	Cardiff City	275	(22)
2004	Newport County		

International career
- Wales U21

Managerial career
- 2009–2012: AFC Porth
- 2012–2014: Port Talbot Town
- 2014: Cardiff City (caretaker)
- 2021–2022: Cambrian & Clydach Vale
- * Club domestic league appearances and goals

Scott Young (born 14 January 1976) is a Welsh former professional footballer.

== Club career ==
Young was born in Tonypandy. He made his first appearance for Cardiff City, under then manager Eddie May, on 6 November 1993 in a 3–1 victory over Stockport County at the age of sixteen. He became a popular figure during his 11 seasons at Cardiff City, especially after scoring the winning goal in the 2–1 win over Leeds United on 6 January 2002 in the third round of the FA Cup. A one-club man since graduating from the Ninian Park ranks, Young made 275 league appearances for the Bluebirds. Unfortunately his later years with Cardiff were blighted by a persistent back injury and he retired at the end of the 2003/04 season at the age of 28.

He attempted a comeback as a Newport County player at the start of the 2004–05 season and was made captain, but further injury problems forced him to retire from football. He returned to the club as assistant manager to Peter Beadle in 2006. Young took over as manager of AFC Porth in October 2009, leaving the club in May 2012 to become first-team coach at Welsh Premier League club Port Talbot Town. After the departure of manager Mark Jones, Scott Young was appointed as interim manager. His first game as manager was against Prestatyn Town F.C., defeating them 1–0 at home. He was later named official first team manager on a permanent basis.

Young, along with Danny Gabbidon, took over as caretaker manager of Cardiff City after the departure of Ole Gunnar Solskjær on 18 September 2014. On 6 October 2014, Leyton Orient manager Russell Slade was appointed as new manager with Young appointed his assistant.

== International career ==
Young was capped by Wales at under-21 and B international level. He also received a call-up to the full Wales in March 2002 but remained on the bench during a 0–0 draw with Czech Republic.
