= Andy Legg =

Welsh footballer and manager

Personal information
- Full name: Andrew Legg
- Date of birth: 28 July 1966 (age 60)
- Place of birth: Neath, Wales
- Height: 6 ft 0 in (1.83 m)
- Positions: Left winger; left back

Youth career
- Baglan Boys Club

Senior career*
Years	Team	Apps	(Gls)
–1988	Briton Ferry Athletic		
1988–1993	Swansea City	163	(29)
1993–1996	Notts County	89	(9)
1996–1998	Birmingham City	45	(5)
1997	→ Ipswich Town (loan)	6	(1)
1998	Reading	12	(0)
1998	→ Peterborough United (loan)	5	(0)
1998–2003	Cardiff City	175	(12)
2003–2005	Peterborough United	81	(5)
2006	Maesteg Park	1	(0)
2006	Newport County	3	(0)
2006	Llanelli	4	(0)
2006–2007	Hucknall Town	29	(4)
2007	→ Llanelli (loan)	0	(0)
2007–2012	Llanelli	111	(7)
Total		724	(72)

International career
1996–2001	Wales	6	(0)

Managerial career
- 2007: Hucknall Town
- 2009–2012: Llanelli
- 2016: Bangor City
- 2017–2019: Cardiff City U23
- 2020–2021: Llanelli
- 2025–: Barry Town United
- * Club domestic league appearances and goals

Andrew Legg (born 28 July 1966) is a Welsh football manager and former Wales international player. He currently manages Barry Town United.

Born in Neath, he began his professional career with Swansea City after joining the club from local non-league football at the age of 22. He made his senior debut in 1988 and went on to make over 150 appearances for the club in all competitions before being sold to Notts County in 1993.

He also played for Birmingham City, Ipswich Town, Reading, Peterborough United, Cardiff City and Newport County. He was one of the cover athletes of FIFA Soccer 96 alongside Ioan Sabău.

He was known for having the longest throw-in in football, being able to regularly throw the ball over 30 metres and once held the world record with a distance of 44.6 m (48.8 yards).

== Early life ==
As a teenager, Legg attended Glan Afan Comprehensive School in Port Talbot. After leaving school, he worked for the Forestry Commission and later as a supervisor in a shelving systems factory. Legg's brother, Paul, was also a footballer and spent time on trial with Swansea City, Cardiff City, Shrewsbury Town and Hull City.

== Career ==
=== Early career ===
After playing for local youth side Baglan Boys Club, where his father was manager, Legg joined Welsh League side Briton Ferry Athletic where he attracted attention from several Football League clubs. He first joined Middlesbrough on trial, playing up front alongside Bernie Slaven for the club's reserve side. However, manager Bruce Rioch was unhappy with Legg's hair, describing him as "too scruffy", and told him to cut his hair or to not come back. Legg decided not to return and travelled back home. He was instead offered a trial at Manchester City and played for the reserve side, again as a forward, before being asked to return at the start of the following season for pre-season training in order for manager Mel Machin to assess him.

=== Swansea City ===
After returning from Manchester, Legg was offered a trial with his home town club Swansea City, playing in a reserve fixture against Cardiff City and, in August 1988, he was offered a professional contract by manager Terry Yorath, starting his professional career at the relatively late age of 22. A stress fracture of his leg meant he was forced to wait for his debut, eventually making his first appearance in a 2–0 defeat to Bristol City.

He went on to make over 150 appearances at Vetch Field and helped win the Welsh Cup in 1989 and 1991 as well as featuring in the team's European Cup Winners' Cup campaigns, playing against Panathinaikos and AS Monaco. During his time with Swansea, Legg's long throw-in ability gained significant attention and he was credited with a Guinness World Record in 1992 after taking part in a long throw competition arranged by the BBC television show Record Breakers held at Wembley Stadium in 1992 against Dave Challinor and Neil Thompson. He recorded a throw distance of 44.6m, a record that stood until the 1996–97 season when it was beaten by Challinor who recorded a throw of 46.3m.

=== Notts County ===
He was sold to Notts County in July 1993 for a fee of £275,000, where he was part of the side that won the Anglo-Italian Cup during the 1994–95 season. Legg was featured on the cover of FIFA 96, alongside Brescia Calcio's Ioan Sabău, a photo taken at that game.

=== Birmingham City ===
Along with Paul Devlin, Legg was sold to Birmingham City in February 1996. Originally signed by Barry Fry, he spent two years, winning his first cap for Wales on 24 April 1996 in a 2–0 defeat to Switzerland but was forced off after 30 minutes due to injury. In the final year of his contract during the 1997–98 season, Legg began negotiations over an extension but, after failing to agree terms, was dropped to the reserve side by manager Trevor Francis. He was instead allowed to join Ipswich Town on loan as cover for the injured Bobby Petta and after a month Ipswich manager George Burley attempted to negotiate a permanent deal, which later collapsed.

=== Reading ===
Soon after, Jason Bowen, a friend of Legg's joined Reading and, thanks to Bowen's praise of the club, he agreed a deal to sign for the Berkshire based side in February 1998. Just several weeks later manager Terry Bullivant was sacked and replaced by Tommy Burns who soon fell out with several players including Legg and Bowen. Burns ignored the group of players, who later became known as the "gang of five", and refused to let them be a part of the first team, resulting in them taking part in separate training sessions taken charge of by reserve team manager Alan Pardew, who took over from Burns following his dismissal. Pardew later commented that ""I wish they had stayed. Andy would certainly be in my team now and Jason showed he had a lot of talent."

=== Cardiff City ===
After a brief spell on loan at Peterborough United, he joined Cardiff City in 1998. Legg was initially unpopular with fans due to his previous spell with South Wales rivals Swansea City, even being sent death threats, former teammate Winston Faerber had his finger sliced open after opening one of Legg's letters which contained a razor blade. However, he eventually became a fan favourite and was awarded the club's player of the season award in the 1999–2000 and 2000–01 seasons. In 1999, Legg's wife Lucy noticed a lump on his neck which was later diagnosed as a non-malignant tumour. With the 1999–2000 season coming to an end, Legg decided to play on for the remainder of the season, the only people aware of his condition at the club being manager Billy Ayre, physio Mike Davenport and club doctor Len Noakes, before having the tumour removed at the Princess of Wales Hospital in Bridgend in May 2000.

He left the club in July 2003 after being asked to take a 70% pay cut for the 2003–04 season, stating "It's a big wrench to leave Cardiff, I'm absolutely gutted [...] I think I deserve better than a 70% pay cut". As a result, his final game for Cardiff was in the 2003 Football League Second Division play-off final, helping the club win promotion to Division One.

=== Peterborough United ===
Following his departure, Legg joined Peterborough United as a player-coach, making his debut on the opening day of the season in a 3–4 defeat to Hartlepool United. As assistant manager to Steve Bleasdale at Peterborough United he featured briefly in the TV series Big Ron Manager alongside Ron Atkinson and Barry Fry. In 2004, a second lump appeared in his throat and, after seeing a specialist, he decided to again wait until the end of the season before undergoing surgery to remove it. However, during a match against Oldham Athletic on 22 January 2005 he was hit in the neck by an elbow from Neil Kilkenny. Reacting angrily, Legg was later sent off for a retaliatory foul on Kilkenny.

Feeling pain from his neck for the first time, Legg booked himself in for the operation in April 2005, making his last appearance for Peterborough on 9 April 2005 in a 1–0 win over Blackpool, a match which would later turn out to be his last match as a professional. He underwent surgery several days later at Queen's Medical Centre in Nottingham. The operation to remove it was successful, although he was forced to undergo a 28 session course of radiation therapy, and Legg was able to return to football, despite having believed that he would be forced to retire.

=== Return to football ===
He made his return with Maesteg Park on 1 February 2006 during a 2–0 win over Bettws. After short spells playing for Newport County and Llanelli, Legg joined Conference North side Hucknall Town. In January 2007, he was appointed manager of Hucknall Town. He remained manager until September 2007, when he resigned following six consecutive defeats at the start of the 2007–2008 season. He returned to play for Llanelli, and was appointed manager of the side in April 2009, replacing Peter Nicholas. At the age of 42, Legg was part of the Llanelli side that inflicted a shock defeat on Scottish Premier League side Motherwell in the first qualifying round of the Europa League in July 2009.

Already a holder of a UEFA A coaching licence, Legg began studying for his UEFA Pro Licence in June 2010.

Legg returned to football as manager of Bangor City in August 2016 but was sacked from the job three months later. In September 2016 he was appointed under-23 manager at his former club Cardiff City. As part of an academy shake-up, Legg left his position on 25 November 2019.

He returned to Llanelli Town in November 2020 for his second spell as manager before leaving the club in November 2021. On 31 January 2025, Legg became manager at Barry Town United.

== Career statistics ==
As of 5 November 2023

Club statistics
Club	Season	League		National Cup		League Cup		Other		Total	
Club	Season	App	Goals	App	Goals	App	Goals	App	Goals	App	Goals
Swansea City	1988–89	6	0								
Swansea City	1989–90	25	3								
Swansea City	1990–91	39	5								
Swansea City	1991–92	46	9								
Swansea City	1992–93	46	12								
Swansea City	Subtotal	163	29	16	4	10	0	18	5	207	38
Notts County	1993–94	30	2							30	2
Notts County	1994–95	34	3							34	3
Notts County	1995–96	25	4							25	4
Notts County	Subtotal	89	9	8	0	11	0	15	6	123	15
Birmingham City	1995–96	13	1	0	0	0	0	0	0	13	1
Birmingham City	1996–97	32	4	3	0	4	0	0	0	39	4
Birmingham City	1997–98	0	0	0	0	0	0	0	0	0	0
Birmingham City	Subtotal	45	5	3	0	4	0	0	0	52	5
Ipswich Town (loan)	1997–98	6	1	0	0	1	0	0	0	7	1
Reading	1997–98	10	0	0	0	0	0	0	0	10	0
Reading	1998–99	2	0	0	0	1	0	0	0	3	0
Reading	Subtotal	12	0	0	0	1	0	0	0	13	0
Peterborough United (loan)	1998–99	5	0	0	0	0	0	0	0	5	0
Cardiff City	1998–99	24	2	3	0	0	0	0	0	27	2
Cardiff City	1999–2000	42	2	5	0	4	0	0	0	51	2
Cardiff City	2000–01	39	3	4	0	2	0	0	0	45	3
Cardiff City	2001–02	35	2	4	0	1	0	0	0	40	2
Cardiff City	2002–03	35	3	5	0	2	0	4	0	46	3
Cardiff City	Subtotal	175	15	21	0	9	0	4	0	209	15
Peterborough United	2003–04	42	0	2	0	1	0	2	0	47	0
Peterborough United	2004–05	39	5	3	0	1	0	1	0	44	5
Peterborough United	Subtotal	81	5	5	0	2	0	3	0	91	5
Maesteg Park	2005–06	1	0	0	0	0	0	0	0	1	0
Newport County	2005–06	3	0	0	0	0	0	0	0	3	0
Llanelli	2006–07	4	0	0	0	0	0	2	0	6	0
Hucknall Town	2006–07	24	2			0	0			24	2
Hucknall Town	2007–08	5	2	0	0	0	0	0	0	5	2
Hucknall Town	Subtotal	29	4	0	0	0	0	0	0	29	4
Llanelli	2007–08	26	1	5	0	6	1	0	0	37	2
Llanelli	2008–09	33	4	3	0	2	0	2	0	40	4
Llanelli	2009–10	27	2	4	0	3	0	2	0	36	2
Llanelli	2010–11	18	0	0	0	0	0	2	0	2	0
Llanelli	2011–12	3	0							3	0
Llanelli	2012–13	4	0							4	0
Llanelli	Subtotal	111	7	12	0	11	1	6	0	140	8
Total		724	75	65	4	49	1	48	11	886	91

== Honours ==
Swansea City

- Welsh Cup: 1988–89, 1990–91

Notts County

- Anglo-Italian Cup: 1994–95

Cardiff City

- Football League Third Division third-place promotion: 1998–99
- Football League Third Division second-place promotion: 2000–01
- Football League Second Division play-offs: 2003
- FAW Premier Cup: 2002

Llanelli

- Welsh Premier League: 2007–08

Individual

- Welsh Premier League Team of the Year: 2008–09
