= Andy Campbell =

English footballer (born 1979)

Personal information
- Full name: Andrew Paul Campbell
- Date of birth: 18 April 1979 (age 47)
- Place of birth: Middlesbrough, England
- Height: 5 ft 6 in (1.68 m)
- Position: Striker

Youth career
- 1993–1995: Middlesbrough

Senior career*
Years	Team	Apps	(Gls)
1995–2002	Middlesbrough	56	(4)
1998–1999	→ Sheffield United (loan)	5	(1)
1999	→ Sheffield United (loan)	6	(2)
2001	→ Bolton Wanderers (loan)	6	(0)
2002	→ Cardiff City (loan)	5	(6)
2002–2006	Cardiff City	68	(6)
2005	→ Doncaster Rovers (loan)	3	(0)
2005	→ Oxford United (loan)	5	(0)
2006	Dunfermline Athletic	5	(0)
2006–2008	Halifax Town	52	(12)
2008–2009	Farsley Celtic	19	(8)
2009–2010	Bradford Park Avenue	22	(6)
2010–2012	Whitby Town	17	(7)
Total		269	(52)

International career
2000	England U21	4	(2)

Managerial career
- 2012–2015: Norton & Stockton Ancients
- 2015–2016: West Auckland Town
- 2021–2023: Middlesbrough Women
- * Club domestic league appearances and goals

Andrew Paul Campbell (born 18 April 1979) is an English football manager and former player. He managed Middlesbrough Women, and is now is the football director of Thornaby FC.

Campbell played as a striker, notably for Middlesbrough, Cardiff City and Dunfermline Athletic. After retiring in 2012, he began a career in management, becoming manager of Norton & Stockton Ancients.

== Playing career ==
=== Middlesbrough ===
Born in Middlesbrough, Campbell started his career with his hometown team Middlesbrough, making his debut on 5 April 1996, coming on as a substitute in a 3–1 win over Sheffield Wednesday. He scored his first goal for the club on 15 October 1997, in a 2–0 win against Sunderland in the League Cup. After loan spells with Sheffield United and Bolton Wanderers, he scored against Manchester United in the FA Cup fourth-round, in a 2–0 win for Middlesbrough on 26 January 2002. After spending the rest of the season on loan at Cardiff City, the deal was made permanent for a reported £1 million.

=== Cardiff City ===
His Cardiff career got off to an explosive start, scoring 6 times in his first 4 appearances. He scored once on his debut against Northampton Town, twice on his third appearance against Blackpool and a hat-trick in his fourth appearance against Oldham Athletic. Overall, he had two fairly productive years at the beginning of his spell at Ninian Park, including a fine lob over goalkeeper Chris Day at the Millennium Stadium to give Cardiff a play-off victory over Queens Park Rangers to put them into the Football League Championship. However, he struggled in his remaining years and after loan spells with Doncaster Rovers and Oxford United, he joined Scottish Premier League club Dunfermline Athletic, making his debut on 28 January 2006, in a 1–1 draw against Motherwell.

=== Later career ===
Campbell signed for Halifax Town on a free transfer on 8 August 2006, although his season was interrupted by a serious knee injury. He made a good start to the following season, netting a brace against Altrincham in the second game of the season, and then a hat-trick against Droylsden later in the month.

He left Halifax after the club folded at the end of the 2007–08 season. In July 2008, he joined Farsley Celtic on trial. After scoring some good goals in pre-season, he was signed on a permanent deal. Six months later, he left Farsley to join another West Yorkshire side Bradford Park Avenue. He scored in his first start with Avenue as they defeated Marine 4–0.

He subsequently joined Whitby Town.

== International career ==
Campbell made his England under-21 debut on 29 March 2000, scoring the opening goal in a 3–0 win over Yugoslavia, securing qualification to the 2000 UEFA European Under-21 Championship. He made two appearances during the group stage of the tournament, first against Turkey, scoring the last goal of a 6–0 win, and against Slovakia.

He made his last appearance for the under-21s during a friendly against Georgia at the Riverside Stadium.

== Managerial career ==
In June 2012 Campbell was appointed manager of Norton & Stockton Ancients. In June 2015 he was appointed manager of West Auckland Town. In August 2021 he was appointed manager of Middlesbrough Women. On 4 April 2023 Campbell left the club with immediate affect.

== Honours ==
=== Player ===
Middlesbrough

- Football League Division One runner-up: 1997–98

Cardiff City

- Football League Second Division play-offs: 2003

=== Manager ===
Norton & Stockton Ancients

- Northern League Division Two promotion: 2014–15
- Ernest Armstrong Cup: 2014–15
