= 2014–15 Cardiff City F.C. season =

Welsh football club season

Cardiff City
2014–15 season
- Chairman: Mehmet Dalman
- Manager: Ole Gunnar Solskjær (until 18 September); Danny Gabbidon & Scott Young (from 18 September – 6 October); Russell Slade(from 6 October)
- Stadium: Cardiff City Stadium
- Championship: 11th
- FA Cup: Fourth round
- League Cup: Third round
- Top goalscorer: League: Kenwyne Jones (11); All: Kenwyne Jones (13)
- Highest home attendance: 26,357 vs Blackpool (FLC, 25 Apr 15)
- Lowest home attendance: 4,194 vs Colchester (FA Cup, 2 Jan 15)
- Average home league attendance: 20,945
Home colours	Away colours	Third colours

The 2014–15 season was Cardiff City Football Club's 98th season playing professional football and the 87th in the Football League. Cardiff were relegated from the Premier League during the last season, meaning an instant return to the Championship, the second tier in English football. Also during this season, it was announced that the club would revert back to blue home kits with the red being made the away kit. The first home game back in blue was a 1-0 victory over Fulham on 10 January 2015.

== Football League Championship ==
=== League table ===
Pos	Team	Pld	W	D	L	GF	GA	GD	Pts
9	Blackburn Rovers	46	17	16	13	66	59	+7	67
10	Birmingham City	46	16	15	15	54	64	−10	63
11	Cardiff City	46	16	14	16	57	61	−4	62
12	Charlton Athletic	46	14	18	14	54	60	−6	60
13	Sheffield Wednesday	46	14	18	14	43	49	−6	60

Updated to match(es) played on 2 May 2015. Source: Sky Sports
Rules for classification: 1) Points; 2) Goal difference; 3) Number of goals scored

=== Results ===
Round	1	2	3	4	5	6	7	8	9	10	11	12	13	14	15	16	17	18	19	20	21	22	23	24	25	26	27	28	29	30	31	32	33	34	35	36	37	38	39	40	41	42	43	44	45	46
Ground	A	H	H	A	A	H	H	A	H	A	A	H	H	A	H	A	A	H	A	H	A	H	A	H	H	A	A	H	A	H	H	A	A	H	A	H	A	H	H	A	H	A	A	H	H	A
Result	D	W	W	L	D	L	L	D	W	D	L	W	W	L	W	L	D	W	W	D	L	L	D	L	W	L	L	L	D	D	D	D	W	L	W	L	W	D	W	D	L	W	L	D	W	W
Position	14	3	2	8	9	15	17	16	15	14	14	12	10	11	11	11	12	12	8	9	11	11	11	12	11	13	13	13	15	16	15	17	13	15	13	15	14	13	13	13	14	12	13	13	13	11

Updated to match(es) played on 18 April 2015. Source: BBC Sport
A = Away; H = Home; W = Win; D = Draw; L = Loss

== Kit ==
Supplier: Cosway Sports
Sponsor(s): Visit Malaysia

Home (Away until 9 January)	Away (Home until 9 January)	Third

Last updated: 9 January 2015.

== First Team Squad ==
No.	Name	Pos.	Nat.	Place of Birth	Age	Apps	Goals	Signed from	Date signed	Fee	Ends
Goalkeepers
1	David Marshall	GK	(Scotland)	Glasgow	30	234	0	Norwich City	12 May 2009	£500,000	2018
32	Joe Lewis	GK	(England)	Bury St Edmunds	27	4	0	Peterborough United	25 May 2012	Free	2016
33	Simon Moore	GK	(England)	Sandown	25	15	0	Brentford	29 July 2013	£150,000	2017
Defenders
2	Lee Peltier	RB	(England)	Liverpool	29	15	0	Huddersfield Town	24 January 2015	Nominal	2018
3	Fábio	LB	(Brazil)	Rio de Janeiro	24	43	0	Manchester United	29 January 2014	Free	2017
4	Scott Malone	LB	(England)	Rowley Regis	24	14	0	Millwall	7 January 2015	£90,000	2017
5	Bruno Ecuele Manga	CB	(Gabon)	Libreville	26	29	3	Lorient	1 September 2014	£4,400,000	2017
6	Ben Turner	CB	(England)	Birmingham	26	120	4	Coventry City	31 August 2011	£750,000	2016
12	Declan John	LB	(Wales)	Merthyr Tydfil	19	30	0	Academy	1 June 2013	Trainee	2018
16	Matthew Connolly	CB	(England)	Barnet	27	65	5	Queens Park Rangers	22 August 2012	£500,000	2017
25	Kevin McNaughton	RB	(Scotland)	Dundee	32	292	2	Aberdeen	26 May 2006	Free	2015
27	Semi Ajayi	CB	(Nigeria)	London	21	0	0	Arsenal	25 March 2015	Loan	2015
28	Kévin Théophile-Catherine	RB	(France)	Saint-Brieuc	25	29	0	Rennes	31 August 2013	£2,100,000	2017
31	Ben Nugent	CB	(England)	Welwyn Garden City	22	14	1	Academy	1 July 2012	Trainee	2016
36	Sean Morrison	CB	(England)	Plymouth	24	43	6	Reading	15 August 2014	£2,620,000	2018
39	Danny Gabbidon	CB	(Wales)	Cwmbran	35	221	10	Crystal Palace	1 September 2014	Free	2015
Midfielders
7	Peter Whittingham	CM	(England)	Nuneaton	30	386	87	Aston Villa	11 January 2007	£350,000	2017
8	Kagisho Dikgacoi	DM	(South Africa)	Brandfort	30	3	0	Crystal Palace	1 July 2014	Free	2017
11	Craig Noone	LW	(England)	Kirkby	27	93	11	Brighton & Hove Albion	30 August 2012	£1,000,000	2016
17	Aron Gunnarsson	CM	(Iceland)	Akureyri	27	168	18	Coventry City	8 July 2011	£350,000	2017
18	Tom Adeyemi	CM	(England)	Norwich	23	23	1	Birmingham City	7 August 2014	£882,000	2017
19	Anthony Pilkington	LW	(Republic of Ireland)	Blackburn	27	21	1	Norwich City	15 August 2014	£875,000	2017
21	Joe Ralls	CM	(England)	Aldershot	22	51	5	Academy	30 September 2011	Trainee	2019
22	Stuart O'Keefe	CM	(England)	Eye	24	6	0	Crystal Palace	28 January 2015	£750,000	2017
26	Filip Kiss	DM	(Slovakia)	Dunajská Streda	24	36	1	Slovan Bratislava	1 July 2012	£500,000	2016
30	Matthew kennedy	RW	(Scotland)	Irvine	20	14	0	Everton	2 February 2015	Undisclosed	2018
40	Kadeem Harris	LW	(England)	Westminster	22	19	2	Wycombe Wanderers	30 January 2012	£150,000	2017
Forwards
9	Kenwyne Jones	CF	(Trinidad and Tobago)	Point Fortin	30	47	14	Stoke City	28 January 2014	Player Swap	2016
10	Adam Le Fondre	CF	(England)	Stockport	28	25	3	Reading	28 May 2014	£2,170,000	2017
13	Eoin Doyle	CF	(Republic of Ireland)	Dublin	27	16	5	Chesterfield	2 February 2015	£750,000	2018
14	Federico Macheda	CF	(Italy)	Rome	23	24	8	Manchester United	1 July 2014	Free	2017
15	Conor McAleny	CF/CM	(England)	Whiston	22	9	2	Everton	2 February 2015	Loan	2015
23	Nicky Maynard	CF	(England)	Winsford	28	26	3	West Ham United	31 August 2012	£2,500,000	2015
24	Joe Mason	CF/CM	(Republic of Ireland)	Plymouth	24	86	19	Plymouth Argyle	10 July 2011	£250,000	2018
29	Alex Revell	CF	(England)	Cambridge	31	17	2	Rotherham United	9 January 2015	£175,000	2017
35	Etien Velikonja	CF	(Slovenia)	Šempeter pri Gorici	26	5	0	Maribor	25 July 2012	£1,574,373	2016
—	Javi Guerra	CF	(Spain)	Vélez-Málaga	32	5	0	Real Valladolid	1 July 2014	Free	2017

Appearances and goals for the club are up to date as of 3 May 2015.

=== Statistics ===
As of 2 May 2015

No.	Pos	Nat	Player	Total		Championship		FA Cup		League Cup	
No.	Pos	Nat	Player	Apps	Goals	Apps	Goals	Apps	Goals	Apps	Goals
1	GK	(Scotland) SCO	David Marshall	38	0	38+0	0	0+0	0	0+0	0
2	DF	(England) ENG	Lee Peltier	15	0	15+0	0	0+0	0	0+0	0
3	DF	(Brazil) BRA	Fábio	30	0	22+6	0	1+1	0	0+0	0
4	DF	(England) ENG	Scott Malone	14	0	12+1	0	1+0	0	0+0	0
5	DF	(Gabon) GAB	Bruno Ecuele Manga	29	3	29+0	3	0+0	0	0+0	0
6	DF	(England) ENG	Ben Turner	13	0	11+0	0	2+0	0	0+0	0
7	MF	(England) ENG	Peter Whittingham	45	6	43+0	6	2+0	0	0+0	0
8	MF	(South Africa) RSA	Kagisho Dikgacoi	3	0	1+1	0	0+0	0	1+0	0
11	MF	(England) ENG	Craig Noone	39	1	33+4	1	2+0	0	0+0	0
13	FW	(Republic of Ireland) IRL	Eoin Doyle	16	5	11+5	5	0+0	0	0+0	0
14	FW	(Italy) ITA	Federico Macheda	25	8	13+8	6	1+1	0	1+1	2
15	FW	(England) ENG	Conor McAleny (on loan from Everton)	8	2	6+2	2	0+0	0	0+0	0
17	MF	(Iceland) ISL	Aron Gunnarsson	48	4	43+2	4	1+0	0	2+0	0
18	MF	(England) ENG	Tom Adeyemi	23	1	11+9	1	1+1	0	1+0	0
19	MF	(Republic of Ireland) IRL	Anthony Pilkington	21	1	15+5	1	0+0	0	0+1	0
21	MF	(England) ENG	Joe Ralls	31	4	15+13	2	1+0	1	2+0	1
22	MF	(England) ENG	Stuart O'Keefe	6	0	4+2	0	0+0	0	0+0	0
23	FW	(England) ENG	Nicky Maynard	12	1	3+7	1	0+0	0	2+0	0
24	FW	(Republic of Ireland) IRL	Joe Mason	7	1	5+2	1	0+0	0	0+0	0
29	FW	(England) ENG	Alex Revell	18	2	9+8	2	1+0	0	0+0	0
30	MF	(Scotland) SCO	Mattew Kennedy	14	0	9+5	0	0+0	0	0+0	0
33	GK	(England) ENG	Simon Moore	15	0	8+2	0	2+0	0	3+0	0
36	DF	(England) ENG	Sean Morrison	42	6	41+0	6	1+0	0	0+0	0
39	DF	(Wales) WAL	Danny Gabbidon	2	0	0+1	0	0+0	0	1+0	0
40	MF	(England) ENG	Kadeem Harris	19	2	3+12	1	2+0	1	0+2	0
45	MF	(Wales) WAL	Tommy O'Sullivan	1	0	0+0	0	0+0	0	0+1	0
55	DF	(England) ENG	Jazzi Barnum-Bobb	2	0	0+0	0	0+0	0	2+0	0
Players currently out on loan:
9	FW	(Trinidad and Tobago) TTO	Kenwyne Jones (at Bournemouth)	36	13	25+9	11	1+1	2	0+0	0
10	FW	(England) ENG	Adam Le Fondre (at Bolton Wanderers)	25	3	19+4	3	0+1	0	1+0	0
12	DF	(Wales) WAL	Declan John (at Barnsley)	10	0	2+4	0	1+0	0	3+0	0
16	DF	(England) ENG	Matthew Connolly (at Watford)	25	0	19+3	0	1+1	0	1+0	0
28	DF	(France) FRA	Kévin Théophile-Catherine (at Saint-Étienne)	1	0	0+0	0	0+0	0	1+0	0
35	FW	(Slovenia) SLO	Etien Velikonja (at Lierse)	1	0	0+0	0	0+0	0	0+1	0
41	DF	(England) ENG	Adedeji Oshilaja (at AFC Wimbledon)	1	0	0+0	0	0+0	0	1+0	0
—	FW	(Spain) ESP	Javi Guerra (at Málaga)	5	0	0+3	0	0+0	0	2+0	0
Players featured for club who have left:
2	DF	(England) ENG	John Brayford	28	0	26+0	0	1+0	0	1+0	0
4	DF	(Spain) ESP	Juan Cala	3	0	1+0	0	0+0	0	2+0	0
5	DF	(England) ENG	Mark Hudson	3	0	3+0	0	0+0	0	0+0	0
13	MF	(South Korea) KOR	Kim Bo-Kyung	5	0	2+0	0	0+0	0	3+0	0
15	MF	(Norway) NOR	Magnus Wolff Eikrem	5	0	0+3	0	0+0	0	2+0	0
20	MF	(Norway) NOR	Mats Møller Dæhli	11	0	7+2	0	0+0	0	0+2	0
30	MF	(Austria) AUT	Guido Burgstaller	5	1	1+2	0	0+0	0	1+1	1
38	MF	(England) ENG	Ravel Morrison (on loan from West Ham United)	7	0	2+5	0	0+0	0	0+0	0

=== Captains ===
As of 2 May

No.	P	Name	Country	No. games	Notes
1	GK	David Marshall	(Scotland)	35	
17	MF	Aron Gunnarsson	(Iceland)	7	
6	DF	Ben Turner	(England)	5	
~~5~~	DF	Mark Hudson	(England)	3	
21	MF	Joe Ralls	(England)	1	

Source: Competitive match reports.
Competitive matches only
Matches started as captain only
Country: FIFA nationality; No.: Squad number; P: Position; Name: Player name; No. Games: Number of games started as captain.

=== Goalscorers ===
As of 2 May

Rank	No.	Pos.	Name	Championship	FA Cup	League Cup	Total
1	~~9~~	FW	(Trinidad and Tobago) Kenwyne Jones	13	2	0	15
2	14	FW	(Italy) Federico Macheda	6	0	2	8
3	7	MF	(England) Peter Whittingham	6	0	0	6
3	36	DF	(England) Sean Morrison	6	0	0	6
5	13	FW	(Republic of Ireland) Eoin Doyle	5	0	0	5
6	17	MF	(Iceland) Aron Gunnarsson	4	0	0	4
6	21	MF	(England) Joe Ralls	2	1	1	4
7	~~10~~	FW	(England) Adam Le Fondre	3	0	0	3
7	5	DF	(Gabon) Bruno Ecuele Manga	3	0	0	3
8	15	FW	(England) Conor McAleny	2	0	0	2
8	29	FW	(England) Alex Revell	2	0	0	2
8	40	MF	(England) Kadeem Harris	1	1	0	2
9	11	MF	(England) Craig Noone	1	0	0	1
9	18	MF	(England) Tom Adeyemi	1	0	0	1
9	19	MF	(Republic of Ireland) Anthony Pilkington	1	0	0	1
9	23	FW	(England) Nicky Maynard	1	0	0	1
9	24	FW	(England) Joe Mason	1	0	0	1
9	~~30~~	MF	(Austria) Guido Burgstaller	0	0	1	1
Own Goals				1	0	1	2
Total				58	4	5	67

=== Disciplinary record ===
As of 2 May

No.	Pos.	Name	Championship		FA Cup		League Cup		Total	
No.	Pos.	Name	Yellow card	Red card	Yellow card	Red card	Yellow card	Red card	Yellow card	Red card
1	GK	(Scotland) David Marshall	0	1	0	0	0	0	0	1
~~2~~	DF	(England) John Brayford	2	0	0	0	0	0	2	0
2	DF	(England) Lee Peltier	5	0	0	0	0	0	4	0
3	DF	(Brazil) Fábio	6	0	0	0	0	0	6	0
~~4~~	DF	(Spain) Juan Cala	1	0	0	0	0	0	1	0
4	DF	(England) Scott Malone	2	0	0	0	0	0	2	0
~~5~~	DF	(England) Mark Hudson	1	0	0	0	0	0	1	0
6	DF	(England) Ben Turner	1	0	1	0	0	0	2	0
7	MF	(England) Peter Whittingham	7	1	1	0	0	0	8	1
~~9~~	FW	(Trinidad and Tobago) Kenwyne Jones	2	0	0	0	0	0	2	0
~~10~~	FW	(England) Adam Le Fondre	2	0	0	0	0	0	2	0
11	MF	(England) Craig Noone	5	0	1	0	0	0	6	0
13	FW	(Republic of Ireland) Eoin Doyle	2	0	0	0	0	0	2	0
14	FW	(Italy) Federico Macheda	3	1	0	0	0	0	3	1
16	DF	(England) Matthew Connolly	6	0	0	0	1	0	7	0
17	MF	(Iceland) Aron Gunnarsson	7	0	0	0	0	0	6	0
18	MF	(England) Tom Adeyemi	3	0	0	0	0	0	3	0
19	MF	(Republic of Ireland) Anthony Pilkington	1	0	0	0	0	0	1	0
~~20~~	MF	(Norway) Mats Møller Dæhli	1	0	0	0	0	0	1	0
21	MF	(England) Joe Ralls	2	0	0	0	0	0	2	0
22	MF	(England) Stuart O'Keefe	1	0	0	0	0	0	1	0
29	FW	(England) Alex Revell	1	0	0	0	0	0	1	0
~~30~~	MF	(Austria) Guido Burgstaller	1	0	0	0	0	0	1	0
30	MF	(Scotland) Matthew Kennedy	1	0	0	0	0	0	0	1
36	DF	(England) Sean Morrison	4	0	0	0	0	0	4	0
~~38~~	MF	(England) Ravel Morrison	1	0	0	0	0	0	1	0
40	MF	(England) Kadeem Harris	2	1	0	0	0	0	2	1
41	DF	(England) Adedeji Oshilaja	0	0	0	0	1	0	1	0
Total			68	3	3	0	2	0	73	3

=== Suspensions served ===
Date	Matches Missed	Player	Reason	Opponents Missed
8 August	2	Juan Cala	(red card) vs Sunderland (2013–14)	Blackburn (A), Coventry (LC)
28 February	1	Peter Whittingham	(yellow card) (yellow-red card) vs Wolves	Rotherham (A)
14 March	1	Federico Macheda	(yellow card) (yellow-red card) vs Brentford	Bournemouth (H)
14 March	3	Kadeem Harris	(red card) vs Brentford	Bournemouth (H), Birmingham (H), Reading (A)
2 May	3	David Marshall	(red card) vs Nottingham Forest	TBC

=== Contracts ===
No.	Pos.	Nat.	Name	Age	Status	Contract length	Expiry date	Source
19	MF	(Scotland)	Don Cowie	31	Rejected	Rejected	June 2014	
—	MF	(Wales)	Anthony Bell	20	Signed	1 year	June 2015	
—	FW	(Wales)	Gethyn Hill	31	Signed	1 year	June 2015	
—	DF	(Wales)	Kane Owen	20	Signed	1 year	June 2015	
7	MF	(England)	Peter Whittingham	29	Signed	3 years	June 2017	
24	FW	(Republic of Ireland) (England)	Joe Mason	23	Signed	4 years	June 2018	
16	DF	(England)	Matthew Connolly	27	Signed	2 years	June 2017	

== Transfers ==
=== In ===
Date	Position	Nationality	Name	From	Fee	Ref.
23 May 2014	LM	(Austria)	Guido Burgstaller	Rapid Wien	£800,000	
28 May 2014	CF	(England)	Adam Le Fondre	Reading	£2,170,000	
1 July 2014	DM	(South Africa)	Kagisho Dikgacoi	Crystal Palace	Free transfer	
1 July 2014	CF	(Spain)	Javi Guerra	Real Valladolid	Free transfer	
1 July 2014	CF	(Italy)	Federico Macheda	Manchester United	Free transfer	
10 July 2014	GK	(United States) (England)	Charlie Horton	Peterborough United	Free transfer	(Note: Joined the Development squad)
7 August 2014	CM	(England)	Tom Adeyemi	Birmingham City	£882,000	
12 August 2014	CF	(England)	Danny Johnson	Guisborough Town	Undisclosed	
15 August 2014	CB	(England)	Sean Morrison	Reading	£2,620,000	
15 August 2014	RW	(Republic of Ireland) (England)	Anthony Pilkington	Norwich City	£875,000	
1 September 2014	CB	(Wales)	Danny Gabbidon	Crystal Palace	Free transfer	
1 September 2014	CB	(Gabon)	Bruno Ecuele Manga	Lorient	£4,400,000	
7 January 2015	LB	(England)	Scott Malone	Millwall	£90,000	
9 January 2015	CF	(England)	Alex Revell	Rotherham United	£175,000	
24 January 2015	RB	(England)	Lee Peltier	Huddersfield Town	Nominal fee	
28 January 2015	CM	(England)	Stuart O'Keefe	Crystal Palace	£750,000	
2 February 2015	CF	(Republic of Ireland)	Eoin Doyle	Chesterfield	£750,000	
2 February 2015	RW	(Scotland)	Matthew Kennedy	Everton	Undisclosed	

- Total spending▼ ~ £13,512,000+

=== Loans in ===
Date	Position	Nationality	Name	From	Date To	Ref.
24 September 2014	RW	(England)	Ravel Morrison	West Ham United	15 December 2014 (Note: Morrison's deal was cut short as Cardiff granted him compassionate leave.)	
2 February 2015	CF	(England)	Conor McAleny	Everton	End of Season	
25 March 2015	CB	(Nigeria) (England)	Semi Ajayi	Arsenal	End of Season	

=== Out ===
Date	Position	Nationality	Name	To	Fee	Ref.
1 July 2014	LW	(Wales)	Craig Bellamy	Retired		
1 July 2014	LB	(England)	Luke Coulson	Oxford United (Note: Following Coulson's release, he signed for Oxford United.)	Free transfer	
1 July 2014	CM	(Republic of Ireland)	Ronnie Hawkins	Free agent	Free transfer	
1 July 2014	LM	(Scotland)	Simon Lappin	St Johnstone (Note: Following Lappin's release, he signed for St Johnstone.)	Free transfer	
1 July 2014	RW	(England)	Tommy Smith	Brentford (Note: Following Smith's release, he signed for Brentford.)	Free transfer	
1 July 2014	LB	(England)	Andrew Taylor	Wigan Athletic	Free transfer	
3 July 2014	RM	(Scotland)	Don Cowie	Wigan Athletic (Note: Following Cowie's release, he signed for Wigan Athletic.)	Free transfer	
22 July 2014	CB	(England)	Steven Caulker	Queens Park Rangers	£8,500,000	
24 July 2014	CF	(England)	Fraizer Campbell	Crystal Palace	£900,000	
5 August 2014	AM	(England)	Jordon Mutch	Queens Park Rangers	£6,000,000	
9 August 2014	DM	(Chile)	Gary Medel	Inter Milan	£10,000,000	
31 August 2014	CB	(England)	Mark Hudson	Huddersfield Town	Undisclosed	
3 December 2014	CB	(Spain)	Juan Cala	Granada (Note: Following the termination of Cala's contract, he signed for Granada.)	Free transfer	
19 December 2014	CM	(Norway)	Magnus Wolff Eikrem	Malmö FF (Note: Following the termination of Eikrem's contract, he signed for Malmö FF.)	Free transfer	
1 January 2015	LW	(Norway)	Mats Møller Dæhli	SC Freiburg	Undisclosed	
16 January 2015	SS	(Norway)	Jo Inge Berget	Malmö FF (Note: Following the termination of Berget's contract, he signed for Malmö FF.)	Free transfer	
24 January 2015	RB	(England)	John Brayford	Sheffield United	Undisclosed	
25 January 2015	AM	(South Korea)	Kim Bo-Kyung	Wigan Athletic (Note: Following the termination of Kim's contract, he signed for Wigan Athletic.)	Free transfer	
26 January 2015	LM	(Austria)	Guido Burgstaller	1. FC Nürnberg (Note: Following the termination of Burgstaller, he signed for 1. FC Nürnberg.)	Free transfer	

=== Loans out ===
Date	Position	Nationality	Name	To	Date to	Ref.
11 July 2014	CB	(England)	Ben Nugent	Yeovil Town	End of Season	
16 July 2014	RB	(Scotland)	Kevin McNaughton	Bolton Wanderers	End of Season	
28 July 2014	SS	(Norway)	Jo Inge Berget	Celtic	16 January 2015	
5 August 2014	GK	(England)	Joe Lewis	Blackpool	End of Season	
11 August 2014	CF	(Republic of Ireland) (England)	Joe Mason	Bolton Wanderers	21 January 2015	
18 August 2014	RB	(France)	Kévin Théophile-Catherine	Saint-Étienne	End of Season	
19 September 2014	CF	(England)	Rhys Healey	Colchester United	End of Season (Note: Healey's loan speal was extended till the end of season.)	
21 October 2014	CF	(England)	Danny Johnson	Tranmere Rovers	17 November 2014	
8 January 2015	DM	(Slovakia)	Filip Kiss	Ross County	End of Season	
8 January 2015	CF	(Slovenia)	Etien Velikonja	Lierse	End of Season	
8 January 2015	CB	(England)	Deji Oshilaja	AFC Wimbledon	End of Season	
26 January 2015	CF	(England)	Adam Le Fondre	Bolton Wanderers	End of Season	
2 February 2015	CM	(Wales)	Tommy O'Sullivan	Port Vale	2 March 2015	
2 February 2015	CF	(England)	Danny Johnson	Stevenage	31 March 2015	
13 February 2015	LWB	(Democratic Republic of the Congo)	David Tutonda	Newport County	End of Season (Note: Tutonda's loan deal was extended to End of Season on 17 March.)	
6 March 2015	LB	(Wales)	Declan John	Barnsley	End of Season	
12 March 2015	CM	(Wales)	Tommy O'Sullivan	Port Vale	End of Season (Note: O'Sullivan's loan deal was extended on 16 April till the End of Season.)	
19 March 2015	CB	(England)	Matthew Connolly	Watford	End of Season	
26 March 2015	CF	(Trinidad and Tobago)	Kenwyne Jones	Bournemouth	2 May 2015	
2 April 2015	CF	(England)	Rhys Healey	Colchester United	2 May 2015	

== Fixtures & Results ==
=== Pre-season ===
7 July 2014	Carmarthen Town	0–3	Cardiff City	Bridge Meadow Stadium, Haverfordwest
19:00 BST		Report	Maynard 6'; Mason 45'; Macheda 59'

12 July 2014	Bath City	1–1	Cardiff City	Twerton Park, Bath
14:00 BST	Evans 77'	Report	Berget 65'	Attendance: 1,032

19 July 2014	Cardiff City	3–2	1860 München	Kirchbichl
15:00 BST	Macheda 22'; Whittingham 30'; Velikonja 86'	Report	Schindler 28'; Wittek 38'

19 July 2014	Cardiff City	3–0	Teuta Durrës	Kirchbichl
18:00 BST	Javi Guerra 20'; Guido 41'; Le Fondre 79'	Report

22 July 2014	Cardiff City	0–3	Amkar Perm	Kössen
16:30 BST		Report	Georgiev 30'; Kolomeytsev 35', 45'

27 July 2014	Yeovil Town	1–4	Cardiff City	Huish Park, Yeovil
15:00 BST	Leitch-Smith 18'	Report	56' (pen.) Le Fondre; 62' Connolly; 73', 90' Jones	Attendance: 2,018

2 August 2014	Cardiff City	3–3	VfL Wolfsburg	Cardiff City Stadium, Cardiff
15:00 BST	Whittingham 43'; Maynard 45'; Kim Bo-kyung 58'	Report	Schäfer 4'; De Bruyne 26'; Olić 84'	Attendance: 8,306

=== Championship ===
8 August 2014 1	Blackburn Rovers	1–1	Cardiff City	Ewood Park, Blackburn
19:45 BST	Lowe (yellow card) 30'; Cairney 40'	Club Report; BBC Report	Jones 18'; Brayford (yellow card) 45+2'; Hudson (yellow card) 80'; Burgstaller (yellow card) 86'	Attendance: 15,625; Referee: Andrew Madley

16 August 2014 2	Cardiff City	3–1	Huddersfield Town	Cardiff City Stadium, Cardiff
15:00 BST	Whittingham 28'; Jones 35', 56'	BBC Report	45+3', (yellow card) 77' Wallace; (yellow card) 60' Hogg; (yellow card) 90+5' Lynch	Attendance: 20,749; Referee: Keith Hill

19 August 2014 3	Cardiff City	1–0	Wigan Athletic	Cardiff City Stadium, Cardiff
19:45 BST	Maynard 53'; Adeyemi (yellow card) 66'	BBC Report		Attendance: 20,662; Referee: Robert Madley

23 August 2014 4	Wolverhampton Wanderers	1–0	Cardiff City	Molineux Stadium, Wolverhampton
15:00 BST	Hudson 90+1' (o.g.)	BBC Report		Attendance: 21,221; Referee: Darren Drysdale

30 August 2014 5	Fulham	1–1	Cardiff City	Craven Cottage, London
15:00 BST	Hoogland 22'	BBC Report	55' Jones	Attendance: 17,508; Referee: James Adcock

13 September 2014 6	Cardiff City	2–4	Norwich City	Cardiff City Stadium, Cardiff
15:00 BST	Ralls 4' (yellow card) 72'; Gunnarsson 22'	BBC Report	(yellow card) 24' Lafferty; 54' Olsson; 58' Hoolahan; 71' (yellow card) 81' Turner; 87' Jerome	Attendance: 21,746; Referee: Mark Haywood

16 September 2014 7	Cardiff City	0–1	Middlesbrough	Cardiff City Stadium, Cardiff
19:45 BST	Juan Cala (yellow card) 24'	Club Report; BBC Report	(yellow card) 1' Ayala; 2' Kike; (yellow card) 37' Damia	Attendance: 19,711; Referee: Graham Scott

20 September 2014 8	Derby County	2–2	Cardiff City	Pride Park Stadium, Derby
15:00 BST	Ibe 61'; Bryson 84'	BBC Report	51' (yellow card) 62' Gunnarrson; 55' (yellow card) 90+1' Whittingham	Attendance: 27,251; Referee: Andre Marriner

27 September 2014 9	Cardiff City	2–1	Sheffield Wednesday	Cardiff City Stadium, Cardiff
15:00 BST	Morrison 39'; Pilkington 61'	BBC Report	(yellow card) 38' Mattock; 51' (o.g.) Morrison; (yellow card) 84' Loovens	Attendance: 20,901; Referee: Michael Bull

30 September 2014 10	Brighton & Hove Albion	1–1	Cardiff City	Falmer Stadium, Brighton
19:45 BST	Bruno 20'; (yellow card) 54' Greer; (yellow card) 55' Forster-Caskey; (yellow card) 90+6' LuaLua	BBC Report	21' Jones; (yellow card) 39' Dæhli; (yellow card) 81' Whittingham; (yellow card) 88' Noone	Attendance: 23,712; Referee: Neil Swarbrick

3 October 2014 11	Blackpool	1–0	Cardiff City	Bloomfield Road, Blackpool
19:45 BST	Zoko 64'; McMahon (yellow card) 84'; Ranger (yellow card) 90+4'	BBC Report; Club Report	(yellow card) 74' Fábio; (yellow card) 89' Whittingham	Attendance: 10,502; Referee: Dean Whitestone

18 October 2014 12	Cardiff City	2–1	Nottingham Forest	Cardiff City Stadium, Cardiff
12:15 BST	Macheda 22'; Whittingham 27'; Noone (yellow card) 45+2'	BBC Report	(yellow card) 40' Wilson; (yellow card) 54' Lansbury; (yellow card) 88' (goal) 89' Assombalonga	Attendance: 21,263; Referee: Mike Jones

21 October 2014 13	Cardiff City	3–1	Ipswich Town	Cardiff City Stadium, Cardiff
19:45 BST	Whittingham 37'; Macheda 47' (yellow card) 74'; Fábio (yellow card) 62'; Le Fondre 69'	BBC Report	29' Murphy; (yellow card) 56' Mings	Attendance: 20,191; Referee: David Coote

25 October 2014 14	Millwall	1–0	Cardiff City	The New Den, Millwall
12:15 BST	Beevers (yellow card) 10'; Shittu 54'; McDonald (yellow card) 90+2'	BBC Report		Attendance: 10,135; Referee: Scott Duncan

1 November 2014 15	Cardiff City	3–1	Leeds United	Cardiff City Stadium, Cardiff
15:00 GMT	Ralls (yellow card) 52'; Ecuele Manga 61'; Macheda 67'; Jones 83' (yellow card) 84'	BBC Report	(yellow card) 10' Pearce; (yellow card) 28' Berardi; (yellow card) 50' (goal) 77' Mowatt	Attendance: 24,220; Referee: Andy Woolmer

4 November 2014 16	Bolton Wanderers	3–0	Cardiff City	Macron Stadium, Bolton
20:00 GMT	Feeney 9', 36'; Mills 76'; Pratley (yellow card) 82'	BBC Report	(yellow card) 82' R Morrison	Attendance: 12,961; Referee: Geoff Eltringham

8 November 2014 17	Birmingham	0–0	Cardiff City	St Andrew's, Birmingham
15:00 GMT		BBC Report		Attendance: 15,950; Referee: Kevin Friend (Leicestershire and Rutland County Football Association)

21 November 2014 18	Cardiff City	2–1	Reading	Cardiff City Stadium, Cardiff
19:45 GMT	Pearce 20' (o.g.); Pilkington (yellow card) 41'; Whittingham 45+4' (pen.)	Report	Williams (yellow card) 41'; Pearce (red card) 45+3'; Hector 81'; Blackman (yellow card) 90'	Attendance: 20,643; Referee: James Linington

29 November 2014 19	Watford	0–1	Cardiff City	Vicarage Road, Watford
15:00 GMT		BBC Report	12' Adam Le Fondre	Attendance: 15,668; Referee: Phil Gibbs

6 December 2014 20	Cardiff City	0–0	Rotherham	Cardiff City Stadium, Cardiff
15:00 GMT		BBC Report		Attendance: 20,419; Referee: Andy D'Urso (Billericay, Essex)

13 December 2014 21	Bournemouth	5–3	Cardiff City	Dean Court, Bournemouth
15:00 GMT	Ritchie 1'; Arter 43'; Pugh 45'; Kermorgant 67'; Wilson 89'	BBC Report	45' Jones; 48', 78' Sean Morrison	Attendance: 10,440; Referee: James Adcock

20 December 2014 22	Cardiff City	2–3	Brentford	Cardiff City Stadium, Cardiff
15:00 GMT	Noone 48'; Jones 75'	BBC Report	Pritchard 11'; Gray 22'; Jota Peleteiro 33'	Attendance: 21,784; Referee: Graham Scott

26 December 2014 23	Charlton Athletic	1–1	Cardiff City	The Valley, London
13:00 GMT	Harriott (red card) 32'; Berg Gudmundsson 88'	BBC Report	12' Adeyemi	Attendance: 17,543; Referee: Mick Russell (Hertfordshire)

28 December 2014 24	Cardiff City	2–4	Watford	Cardiff City Stadium, Cardiff
15:00 GMT	Le Fondre 20'; Jones 90'	BBC Report	42', 63' Guédioura; 45' Ighalo; 83' Angella	Attendance: 22,208; Referee: Stuart Attwell (Nuneaton)

10 January 2015 25	Cardiff City	1–0	Fulham	Cardiff City Stadium, Cardiff
15:00 GMT	S Morrison 14'	BBC Report	(yellow card) 6' Hutchinson	Attendance: 22,515; Referee: Nigel Miller

17 January 2015 26	Norwich City	3–2	Cardiff City	Carrow Road, Norwich
15:00 GMT	Hooper 15'; Lafferty 25'; Jerome 45+2'; O'Neil (yellow card) 69'	BBC Report	(yellow card) 38' Le Fondre; 61' Revell; 64' Harris; (yellow card) 81' Adeyemi; (yellow card) 86' Noone	Attendance: 25,995; Referee: James Adcock (Nottinghamshire)

20 January 2015 27	Middlesbrough	2–1	Cardiff City	The Riverside, Middlesbrough
19:45 GMT	Clayton (yellow card) 55'; Leadbitter (yellow card) 61'; Bamford 63'; Tomlin 79'; Vossen (yellow card) 90+4'	BBC Report	(yellow card) 32' Brayford; 86' Jones	Attendance: 16,035; Referee: Geoff Eltringham (County Durham)

31 January 2015 28	Cardiff City	0–2	Derby County	Cardiff City Stadium, Cardiff
15:00 GMT	Gunnarsson (yellow card) 55'; Connolly (yellow card) 72'; Fabio (yellow card) 90'	Report	23' (o.g.) Malone; 45' Martin; (yellow card) 45' Hughes; (yellow card) 59' Bennett	Attendance: 22,227; Referee: Paul Tierney (Wigan)

7 February 2015 29	Sheffield Wednesday	1–1	Cardiff City	Hillsborough, Sheffield
15:00 GMT	Keane 75' (pen.)	BBC Report	7' Jones	Attendance: 22,344; Referee: Kevin Wright

10 February 2015 30	Cardiff City	0–0	Brighton	Cardiff City Stadium, Cardiff
19:45 GMT	O'Keefe (yellow card) 37'; Peltier (yellow card) 90+3'	BBC Report	(yellow card) 68' Calderon; (yellow card) 86' Bruno	Attendance: 19,206; Referee: Iain Williamson

17 February 2015 31	Cardiff City	1–1	Blackburn Rovers	Cardiff City Stadium, Cardiff
19:45 GMT	Morrison 84'	BBC Report	Gestede 90'	Attendance: 19,057; Referee: Brendan Malone

21 February 2015 32	Huddersfield Town	0–0	Cardiff City	John Smith's Stadium, Huddersfield
15:00 GMT		BBC Report		Attendance: 12,798; Referee: Mark Haywood

24 February 2015 33	Wigan	0–1	Cardiff City	DW Stadium, Wigan
19:45 GMT		BBC Report	20' Gunnarsson	Attendance: 10,016; Referee: Andy Woolmer

28 February 2015 34	Cardiff City	0–1	Wolverhampton Wanderers	Cardiff City Stadium, Cardiff
15:00 GMT		BBC Report	26' Sako	Attendance: 21,165; Referee: Robert Madley

3 March 2015 35	Rotherham	1–3	Cardiff City	New York Stadium, Rotherham
19:45 GMT	Ward 80'; Green (yellow card) 85'	BBC Report	24' Ecuele Managa; 26' Macheda; 35' McAleny	Attendance: 8,534; Referee: James Adcock

7 March 2015 36	Cardiff City	1–2	Charlton Athletic	Cardiff City Stadium, Cardiff
15:00 GMT	Connolly (yellow card) 40'; Macheda 56'	BBC Report	(yellow card) 34' Fox; (yellow card) 43' Lepoint; 74' Watt; 87' (pen.) Buyens	Attendance: 20,488; Referee: Pat Miller

14 March 2015 37	Brentford	1–2	Cardiff City	Griffin Park, London
15:00 GMT	Gray 28'	BBC Report	(yellow card) 27' Morrison; (yellow card) 40' (yellow-red card) 89' (goal) 53' Macheda; (yellow card) 58' Whittingham; 68' Revell; (red card) 78' Harris	Attendance: 11,217; Referee: Andy Davies

17 March 2015 38	Cardiff City	1–1	Bournemouth	Cardiff City Stadium, Cardiff
19:45 GMT	Manga 62'; Connolly (yellow card) 67'; Fabio (yellow card) 90'	BBC Report	Arter 16'; Wilson (yellow card) 73'; Francis (yellow card) 90'	Attendance: 19,819; Referee: Lee Mason

21 March 2015 39	Cardiff City	2–0	Birmingham	Cardiff City Stadium, Cardiff
15:00 GMT	Doyle 50'; Whittingham 75' (pen.)	BBC Report	(yellow card) 23' Spector; (yellow card) 89' Caddis	Attendance: 20,602; Referee: Graham Salisbury

4 April 2015 40	Reading	1–1	Cardiff City	Madjeski Stadium, Reading
15:00 BST	Pogrebnyak 4'	BBC Report	McAleny 90'	Attendance: 17,953; Referee: Scott Duncan

6 April 2015 41	Cardiff City	0–3	Bolton Wanderers	Cardiff City Stadium, Cardiff
15:00 BST		BBC Report	(yellow card) 8' Vela; 55' Guðjohnsen; 59', 73' Davies	Attendance: 20,219; Referee: Keith Stroud

11 April 2015 42	Leeds United	1–2	Cardiff City	Elland Road, Leeds
15:00 BST	Phillips 17'; Bellusci (yellow card) 54'; Mowatt (yellow card) 83'	BBC Report	14' (yellow card) 45+2' Morrison; (yellow card) 36' Peltier; (yellow card) 55' (goal) 62' Gunnarsson; (yellow card) 85' Harris	Attendance: 22,401; Referee: Chris Kavanagh

14 April 2015 43	Ipswich Town	3–1	Cardiff City	Portman Road, Ipswich
19:45 BST	Sears 8'; Skuse (yellow card) 12' (goal) 29'; Berra (yellow card) 27'; Mings (yellow card) 61'; Murphy 90+3'	BBC Report	Doyle 13'; Fabio (yellow card) 61'; Malone (yellow card) 67'	Attendance: 17,722; Referee: Gavin Ward

18 April 2015 44	Cardiff City	0–0	Millwall	Cardiff City Stadium, Cardiff
15:00 BST	Peltier (yellow card) 39'; Doyle (yellow card) 76'	BBC Report	(yellow card) 38' Gregory	Attendance: 19,639; Referee: Mark Brown

25 April 2015 45	Cardiff City	3–2	Blackpool	Cardiff City Stadium, Cardiff
15:00 BST	Mason 19'; Doyle 31' (pen.) 76' (pen.); Kennedy (yellow card) 36'; Noone (yellow card) 70'	BBC Report	Addison (yellow card) 45'; Orlandi 48'; O'Hara (yellow card) 66'; Clarke 90+2'	Attendance: 26,357; Referee: Steve Martin

2 May 2015 46	Nottingham Forest	1–2	Cardiff City	City Ground, Nottingham
12:15 BST	Lascelles (yellow card) 41'; Antonio (yellow card) 45+2'; Kane (yellow card) 66'; Lansbury (yellow card) 76'; Blackstock 90+1'	BBC Report	Ralls 14'; Peltier (yellow card) 16'; Doyle 24'; Gunnarsson (yellow card) 57'; Marshall (red card) 76'	Attendance: 21,988; Referee: Peter Bankes

=== FA Cup ===
2 January 2015 Third Round	Cardiff City	3–1	Colchester United	Cardiff City Stadium, Cardiff
19:45 GMT	Ralls 34'; Harris 53'; Jones 60'	BBC Report	Sears 74'	Attendance: 4,194; Referee: James Linington

24 January 2015 Fourth Round	Cardiff City	1–2	Reading	Cardiff City Stadium, Cardiff
15:00 GMT (UTC)	Turner (yellow card) 25'; Jones 25'; Whittingham (yellow card) 32'; Noone (yellow card) 67'	BBC	Norwood 64'; Pogrebnyak (yellow card) 66'; Robson-Kanu 88'	Attendance: 11,750; Referee: Lee Probert

=== League Cup ===
13 August 2014 First round	Coventry City	1–2	Cardiff City	Sixfields Stadium, Northampton
19:45 BST	Miller 83'	Report	4' Burgstaller; (yellow card) 20' Connolly; 81' (o.g.) Haynes	Attendance: 1,382; Referee: Simon Hooper

26 August 2014 Second round	Port Vale	2–3	Cardiff City	Vale Park, Stoke-on-Trent
19:45 BST	O'Connor 34'; Dodds (yellow card) 48'; Brown 90+3'	Report	26' Ralls; 60' 79' Macheda; (yellow card) 78' Oshilaja	Attendance: 4,390; Referee: David Webb

23 September 2014 Third round	Cardiff City	0–3	Bournemouth	Cardiff City Stadium, Cardiff
19:45 BST		BBC Report	9' 33' Gosling; 22' Daniels	Attendance: 6,491; Referee: Andy Madley

== Overall summary ==
=== Summary ===
Games played	51 (46 Championship, 2 FA Cup, 3 League Cup)
Games won	19 (16 Championship, 1 FA Cup, 2 League Cup)
Games drawn	14 (14 Championship, 0 FA Cup, 0 League Cup)
Games lost	18 (16 Championship, 1 FA Cup, 1 League Cup)
Goals scored	69 (60 Championship, 4 FA Cup, 5 League Cup)
Goals conceded	70 (61 Championship, 3 FA Cup, 6 League Cup)
Goal difference	−1
Clean sheets	9 (9 Championship, 0 FA Cup, 0 League Cup)
Yellow cards	75 (70 Championship, 3 FA Cup, 2 League Cup)
Red cards	4 (4 Championship, 0 FA Cup, 0 League Cup)
Worst discipline	Peter Whittingham (8 (yellow card) , 1 (red card) )
Best result	W 3–1 vs Huddersfield Town (16 August); W 3–1 vs Ipswich Town (21 October); W 3–1 vs Leeds United (1 November); W 3–1 vs Rotherham United (3 March)
Worst result	L 0–3 vs Bournemouth (24 September); L 0–3 vs Bolton Wanderers (6 April)
Most appearances	Aron Gunnarsson (46)
Top scorer	Kenwyne Jones (15)
Points	62

=== Score overview ===
Opposition	Home score	Away score	Double
Birmingham City	2–0	0–0	No
Blackburn Rovers	1–1	1–1	No
Blackpool	3–2	0–1	No
Bolton Wanderers	0–3	0–3	No
Bournemouth	1–1	3–5	No
Brentford	2–3	2–1	No
Brighton & Hove Albion	0–0	1–1	No
Charlton Athletic	1–2	1–1	No
Derby County	0–2	2–2	No
Fulham	1–0	1–1	No
Huddersfield Town	3–1	0–0	No
Ipswich Town	3–1	1–3	No
Leeds United	3–1	2–1	Yes
Middlesbrough	0–1	1–2	No
Millwall	0–0	0–1	No
Norwich City	2–4	2–3	No
Nottingham Forest	2–1	2–1	Yes
Reading	2–1	1–1	No
Rotherham United	0–0	3–1	No
Sheffield Wednesday	2–1	1–1	No
Watford	2–4	1–0	No
Wigan Athletic	1–0	1–0	Yes
Wolverhampton Wanderers	0–1	0–1	No

== Development Team ==
Note: Flags indicate national team as defined under FIFA eligibility rules; some limited exceptions apply. Players may hold more than one non-FIFA nationality.

No.	Pos.	Nation	Player
41	DF	ENG	Adedeji Oshilaja (on loan at AFC Wimbledon)
42	GK	ENG	Ben Wilson
43	MF	WAL	Theo Wharton
44	DF	WAL	Tom James
45	MF	WAL	Tommy O'Sullivan
46	FW	ENG	Rhys Healey (on loan at Colchester United)
47	DF	URU	Maximiliano Amondarain
49	DF	WAL	Josh Yorwerth
50	MF	ENG	Anthony Bell
51	FW	WAL	Gethyn Hill
53	DF	WAL	Kane Owen

No.	Pos.	Nation	Player
54	MF	WAL	Jaye Bowne
55	DF	ENG	Jazzi Barnum-Bobb
57	DF	WAL	Bradley Wickham
58	DF	WAL	Curtis Watkins
60	DF	COD	David Tutonda (on loan at Newport County)
61	MF	WAL	Macauley Southam
62	MF	WAL	Tyler Roche
—	GK	USA	Charlie Horton
—	DF	WAL	Ben Watkins
—	FW	WAL	Dane Griffiths
—	FW	ENG	Danny Johnson

== Club staff ==
=== Backroom staff ===
Position	Name
First-team manager	(England) Russell Slade
Assistant manager	(Wales) Scott Young
Head coach	(Wales) Paul Trollope
Goalkeeper coach	(Wales) Martyn Margetson
First-team coach	(Wales) Danny Gabbidon
First-team coach	(Wales) James Rowberry
Head of Medical	(Wales) Hywel Griffiths MCSP HCPC
First-team physiotherapist	(England) Adam Rattenberry MCSP SRP
Head of Fitness & Condition	(England) Lee Southernwood
Strength & Conditioning Coach	(Wales) Mike Beere
Club doctor	(Wales) Dr. Len Nokes
Performance & Recruitment Analyst	(England) Graham Younger
Opposition Analyst	(England) Martin Hodge
Kit & equipment manager	(England) Ian Lenning

=== Board of directors ===
Position	Name
Chairman	(Cyprus) Mehmet Dalman
General Manager	(Malaysia) Ken Choo
Finance Director	(Wales) Richard Thompson
Non-Executive; Board Members; Football Club	(Wales) Steve Borley (Malaysia) Derek Chee Seng Chin (England) Paul Guy (Malaysia) Len Wing Kong (Malaysia) Meng Kwong Lim (Wales) Michael Isaac (Malaysia) Vincent Lye Ek Seang
Non-Executive; Board Members; Cardiff City (Holdings)	(Cyprus) Mehmet Dalman; Danni Rais
