= 2013–14 Cardiff City F.C. season =

Welsh football club season

Cardiff City
2013–14 season
- Chairman: Mehmet Dalman
- Manager: Malky Mackay (until 27 December); David Kerslake (caretaker; until 2 January); Ole Gunnar Solskjær (from 2 January)
- Stadium: Cardiff City Stadium
- Premier League: 20th (relegated)
- FA Cup: Fifth round
- League Cup: Third round
- Top goalscorer: League: Jordon Mutch (7); All: Fraizer Campbell (9)
- Highest home attendance: 28,018 vs Liverpool
- Lowest home attendance: 26,632 vs West Bromwich Albion
- Average home league attendance: 27,430
Home colours	Away colours	Third colours

The 2013–14 season was Cardiff City Football Club's first season in the Premier League, and their first in the top division of English football since the 1961–62 season. This ended ten consecutive years in the Football League second division. Overall, it was their 16th season competing in England's top division.

== Kit ==
Supplier: Puma
Sponsor(s): Visit Malaysia

Home	Away	2nd Alternate

Last updated: 2 June 2013.
Source: Historic Football Kits – Premier League 2013–14

== Premier League ==
=== League table ===
Pos	Team	Pld	W	D	L	GF	GA	GD	Pts	Qualification or relegation
16	Hull City	38	10	7	21	38	53	−15	37	Qualification for the Europa League third qualifying round (Note: Hull City qualified for the Europa League third qualifying round as runners-up of the 2013–14 FA Cup since winners Arsenal qualified for Champions League.)
17	West Bromwich Albion	38	7	15	16	43	59	−16	36	
18	Norwich City (R)	38	8	9	21	28	62	−34	33	Relegation to Football League Championship
19	Fulham (R)	38	9	5	24	40	85	−45	32	Relegation to Football League Championship
20	Cardiff City (R)	38	7	9	22	32	74	−42	30	Relegation to Football League Championship

Source: Barclays Premier League
Rules for classification: 1) Points; 2) Goal difference; 3) Goals scored; 4) Play-offs (only if needed to decide champion, teams for relegation or teams for UEFA competitions).
(R) Relegated

=== Results summary ===
Overall								Home						Away					
Pld	W	D	L	GF	GA	GD	Pts	W	D	L	GF	GA	GD	W	D	L	GF	GA	GD
38	7	9	22	32	73	−41	30	5	5	9	20	35	−15	2	4	13	12	38	−26

Last updated: 12 May 2014.
Source: Cardiff City FC

=== Results by matchday ===
Matchday	1	2	3	4	5	6	7	8	9	10	11	12	13	14	15	16	17	18	19	20	21	22	23	24	25	26	27	28	29	30	31	32	33	34	35	36	37	38
Ground	A	H	H	A	H	A	H	A	A	H	A	H	H	A	A	H	A	H	H	A	H	A	A	H	A	H	H	A	H	A	H	A	H	A	H	A	A	H
Result	L	W	D	D	L	W	L	L	D	W	L	D	L	D	L	W	L	L	D	L	L	L	L	W	L	D	L	L	W	L	L	D	L	W	D	L	L	L
Position	19	11	10	10	16	11	13	16	15	12	13	15	17	15	16	14	15	16	16	17	18	20	20	19	19	19	19	19	18	19	19	18	19	19	18	20	20	20

Updated to match(es) played on 12 May 2014. Source: Statto.com
A = Away; H = Home; W = Win; D = Draw; L = Loss

== First Team squad ==
No.	Name	Pos.	Nat.	Place of Birth	Age	Apps	Goals	Signed from	Date signed	Fee	Ends
Goalkeepers
1	David Marshall	GK	(Scotland)	Glasgow	29	196	0	Norwich City	12 May 2009	£500,000	2018
32	Joe Lewis	GK	(England)	Bury St. Edmunds	26	5	0	Peterborough United	1 July 2012	Free	2016
Defenders
2	Matthew Connolly	CB	(England)	Barnet	26	40	5	Queens Park Rangers	22 August 2012	£500,000	2015
3	Andrew Taylor	LB	(England)	Hartlepool	27	115	2	Middlesbrough	4 July 2011	Free	2016
4	Steven Caulker	CB	(England)	London	22	39	5	Tottenham Hotspur	31 July 2013	£8,000,000	2017
5	Mark Hudson	CB	(England)	Guildford	32	162	11	Charlton Athletic	2 July 2009	£1,075,000	2015
6	Ben Turner	CB	(England)	Birmingham	25	107	4	Coventry City	31 August 2011	£750,000	2016
25	Kevin McNaughton	RB	(Scotland)	Dundee	31	292	2	Aberdeen	26 May 2006	Free	2015
27	Juan Cala	CB	(Spain)	Lebrija	24	8	2	Sevilla	7 February 2014	Free	2016
28	Kévin Théophile-Catherine	RB	(France)	Saint-Brieuc	24	29	0	Rennes	31 August 2013	£2,100,000	2017
35	Fábio	LB	(Brazil)	Rio de Janeiro	23	13	0	Manchester United	29 January 2014	Free	2017
42	Declan John	LB	(Wales)	Merthyr Tydfil	18	22	0	Academy	1 July 2013	Trainee	2018
Midfielders
7	Peter Whittingham	CM/LM	(England)	Nuneaton	29	340	79	Aston Villa	11 January 2007	£350,000	2015
8	Gary Medel	DM/CB	(Chile)	Santiago	26	35	0	Sevilla	10 August 2013	£9,500,000	2017
13	Kim Bo-Kyung	AM	(South Korea)	Gurye	24	59	3	Cerezo Osaka	27 July 2012	£2,000,000	2015
15	Magnus Wolff Eikrem	CM	(Norway)	Molde	23	8	0	Heerenveen	8 January 2014	£2,000,000	2016
16	Craig Noone	RW	(England)	Kirkby	26	54	10	Brighton & Hove Albion	30 August 2012	£1,000,000	2016
17	Aron Gunnarsson	CM	(Iceland)	Akureyri	26	118	14	Coventry City	8 July 2011	£350,000	2016
18	Jordon Mutch	AM	(England)	Alvaston	22	60	7	Birmingham City	22 June 2012	£2,000,000	2015
19	Don Cowie	RM	(Scotland)	Inverness	31	97	9	Watford	1 July 2011	Free	2014
24	Simon Lappin	LM/LB	(Scotland)	Glasgow	31	2	0	Norwich City	29 January 2013	Free	2014
29	Mats Møller Dæhli	AM/WG	(Norway)	Oslo	19	15	1	Molde	11 January 2014	Undisclosed	2016
36	Wilfried Zaha	RW	(England) (Ivory Coast)	Abidjan	21	13	0	Manchester United	31 January 2014	Loan	2014
Forwards
9	Kenwyne Jones	CF	(Trinidad and Tobago)	Point Fortin	29	11	1	Stoke City	28 January 2014	Player swap	2016
10	Fraizer Campbell	CF	(England)	Huddersfield	26	52	16	Sunderland	21 January 2013	£650,000	2016
14	Tommy Smith	RW	(England)	Hemel Hempstead	34	26	1	Queens Park Rangers	24 August 2012	£300,000	2014
20	Joe Mason	CF	(Republic of Ireland) (England)	Plymouth	23	78	18	Plymouth Argyle	10 July 2011	£250,000	2016
34	Jo Inge Berget	SS	(Norway)	Oslo	23	2	0	Molde	24 January 2014	Undisclosed	2016
39	Craig Bellamy	LW	(Wales)	Cardiff	34	91	18	Liverpool	10 August 2012	Free	2014
Out on Loan
12	John Brayford	RB	(England)	Stoke-on-Trent	26	2	0	Derby County	26 July 2013	£1,500,000	2017
21	Joe Ralls	CM	(England)	Aldershot	20	20	1	Academy	30 September 2011	Trainee	2016
23	Nicky Maynard	CF	(England)	Winsford	27	14	2	West Ham United	31 August 2012	£2,500,000	2015
26	Filip Kiss	DM	(Slovakia)	Dunajská Streda	23	36	1	Slovan Bratislava	1 July 2012	Undisclosed	2016
33	Simon Moore	GK	(England)	Sandown	24	0	0	Brentford	29 July 2013	£150,000	2017

=== Statistics ===
As of 12 May 2014

No.	Pos	Nat	Player	Total		Premier League		FA Cup		League Cup	
No.	Pos	Nat	Player	Apps	Goals	Apps	Goals	Apps	Goals	Apps	Goals
1	GK	(Scotland) SCO	David Marshall	40	0	37	0	3	0	0	0
2	DF	(England) ENG	Matthew Connolly	4	0	3	0	0	0	1	0
3	DF	(England) ENG	Andrew Taylor	19	0	18	0	1	0	0	0
4	DF	(England) ENG	Steven Caulker	39	5	38	5	1	0	0	0
5	DF	(England) ENG	Mark Hudson	6	0	2	0	2	0	2	0
6	DF	(England) ENG	Ben Turner	33	0	30+1	0	2	0	0	0
7	MF	(England) ENG	Peter Whittingham	34	3	30+2	3	2	0	0	0
8	MF	(Chile) CHI	Gary Medel	35	0	34	0	1	0	0	0
9	FW	(Trinidad and Tobago) TTO	Kenwyne Jones	11	1	6+5	1	0	0	0	0
10	FW	(England) ENG	Fraizer Campbell	40	9	32+5	6	1+2	3	0	0
13	MF	(South Korea) KOR	Kim Bo-kyung	31	1	21+7	1	2+1	0	0	0
14	FW	(England) ENG	Tommy Smith	3	0	0	0	0+1	0	1+1	0
15	MF	(Norway) NOR	Magnus Wolff Eikrem	8	0	1+5	0	2	0	0	0
16	MF	(England) ENG	Craig Noone	23	3	13+5	1	0+3	1	2	1
17	MF	(Iceland) ISL	Aron Gunnarsson	25	1	17+6	1	2	0	0	0
18	MF	(England) ENG	Jordon Mutch	37	7	26+9	7	0	0	2	0
19	MF	(Scotland) SCO	Don Cowie	22	0	10+8	0	1+1	0	2	0
20	FW	(Republic of Ireland) IRL	Joe Mason	3	0	0	0	1	0	1+1	0
25	DF	(Scotland) SCO	Kevin McNaughton	9	0	3+2	0	2	0	1+1	0
27	DF	(Spain) ESP	Cala	8	2	7	2	1	0	0	0
28	DF	(France) FRA	Kévin Théophile-Catherine	29	0	25+2	0	2	0	0	0
29	MF	(Norway) NOR	Mats Møller Dæhli	15	1	5+8	1	1+1	0	0	0
32	GK	(England) ENG	Joe Lewis	3	0	1	0	0	0	2	0
34	FW	(Norway) NOR	Jo Inge Berget	2	0	0+1	0	1	0	0	0
35	DF	(Brazil) BRA	Fábio	13	0	13	0	0	0	0	0
36	MF	(England) ENG	Wilfried Zaha (on loan from Manchester United)	13	0	5+7	0	1	0	0	0
37	DF	(Wales) WAL	Tom James	1	0	0+1	0	0	0	0	0
39	FW	(Wales) WAL	Craig Bellamy	23	2	13+10	2	0	0	0	0
42	DF	(Wales) WAL	Declan John	20	0	13+4	0	1	0	2	0
46	FW	(England) ENG	Rhys Healey	1	0	0+1	0	0	0	0	0
Players currently out on loan:
12	DF	(England) ENG	John Brayford (at Sheffield United)	2	0	0	0	0	0	2	0
23	FW	(England) ENG	Nicky Maynard (at Wigan Athletic)	10	1	0+8	0	0	0	2	1
Players featured for club who have left:
9	FW	(Denmark) DEN	Andreas Cornelius	11	0	0+8	0	2	0	1	0
11	FW	(Nigeria) NGR	Peter Odemwingie	17	2	11+4	1	1	0	1	1
15	FW	(Benin) BEN	Rudy Gestede	6	1	0+4	0	0	0	0+2	1
22	MF	(Scotland) SCO	Craig Conway	1	0	0	0	0	0	0+1	0

=== Captains ===
As of 12 May 2014

No.	P	Name	Country	No. games	Notes
4	DF	Steven Caulker	(England)	34	
5	DF	Mark Hudson	(England)	6	Club Captain
39	FW	Craig Bellamy	(Wales)	4	

Source: Competitive match reports.
Competitive matches only
Matches started as captain only
Country: FIFA nationality; No.: Squad number; P: Position; Name: Player name; No. Games: Number of games started as captain.

=== Goalscorers ===
As of 12 May 2014

Rank	No.	Pos.	Name	Premier League	FA Cup	League Cup	Total
1	10	FW	Fraizer Campbell	6	3	0	9
2	18	MF	Jordon Mutch	7	0	0	7
3	4	DF	Steven Caulker	5	0	0	5
4	7	MF	Peter Whittingham	3	0	0	3
4	16	MF	Craig Noone	1	1	1	3
6	~~11~~	FW	Peter Odemwingie	1	0	1	2
6	27	DF	Cala	2	0	0	2
6	39	FW	Craig Bellamy	1	0	0	1
9	9	FW	Kenwyne Jones	1	0	0	1
9	13	MF	Kim Bo-kyung	1	0	0	1
9	~~15~~	FW	Rudy Gestede	0	0	1	1
9	17	MF	Aron Gunnarsson	1	0	0	1
9	23	FW	Nicky Maynard	0	0	1	1
9	29	MF	Mats Møller Dæhli	1	0	0	1
Total				30	4	4	37

=== Disciplinary record ===
As of 12 May 2014

No.	Pos.	Name	Premier League		FA Cup		League Cup		Total	
No.	Pos.	Name	Yellow card	Red card	Yellow card	Red card	Yellow card	Red card	Yellow card	Red card
1	GK	David Marshall	2	0	0	0	0	0	2	0
2	DF	Matthew Connolly	2	0	0	0	0	0	2	0
4	DF	Steven Caulker	1	0	0	0	0	0	1	0
5	DF	Mark Hudson	0	0	1	0	0	0	1	0
6	DF	Ben Turner	5	0	0	0	0	0	5	0
7	MF	Peter Whittingham	3	0	0	0	0	0	3	0
8	MF	Gary Medel	6	0	0	0	0	0	6	0
10	FW	Fraizer Campbell	4	0	1	0	0	0	5	0
11	FW	Peter Odemwingie	1	0	0	0	0	0	1	0
13	MF	Kim Bo-kyung	4	0	1	0	0	0	5	0
16	MF	Craig Noone	2	0	0	0	0	0	2	0
17	MF	Aron Gunnarsson	1	0	1	0	0	0	2	0
18	MF	Jordon Mutch	5	0	0	0	0	0	5	0
19	MF	Don Cowie	2	0	0	0	0	0	2	0
22	MF	Craig Conway	0	0	0	0	1	0	1	0
27	DF	Juan Cala	3	1	0	0	0	0	3	1
28	DF	Kévin Théophile-Catherine	3	0	0	0	0	0	3	0
35	DF	Fábio	2	0	0	0	0	0	2	0
36	MF	Wilfried Zaha	1	0	0	0	0	0	1	0
39	FW	Craig Bellamy	3	0	0	0	0	0	3	0
Total			50	1	4	0	1	0	55	1

=== Suspensions served ===
Date	Matches Missed	Player	Reason	Opponents Missed
4 May 2013	1	Andrew Taylor	(yellow card) (yellow-red card) vs Hull City	West Ham (A)
11 February 2014	3	Craig Bellamy	FA suspension	Aston Villa (H), Wigan (FA), Hull (H)
27 April 2014	4	Cala	(red card) vs Sunderland	Newcastle (A), Chelsea (H), TBC, TBC

=== Contracts ===
No.	Pos.	Nat.	Name	Age	Status	Contract length	Expiry date	Source
25	DF	(Scotland)	Kevin McNaughton	30	Signed	1 year	June 2014	Sky Sports
52	DF	(England)	Luke Coulson	19	Extended	1 year	June 2014	BBC Sport
41	DF	(England)	Adedeji Oshilaja	20	Signed	Undisclosed	Undisclosed	BBC Sport
53	DF	(Republic of Ireland)	Ronnie Hawkins	19	Signed	1 year	June 2014	BBC Sport
5	DF	(England)	Mark Hudson	31	Signed	2 years	June 2015	BBC Sport
42	DF	(Wales)	Declan John	18	Signed	5 years	June 2018	BBC Sport
1	GK	(Scotland)	David Marshall	28	Signed	4.5 years	June 2018	BBC Sport
25	DF	(Scotland)	Kevin McNaughton	31	Signed	1.5 years	June 2015	BBC Sport

== Transfers ==
=== In ===
No.	Pos.	Nat.	Name	Age	EU	Moving from	Type	Transfer window	Ends	Transfer fee	Source
9	FW	(Denmark)	Andreas Cornelius	20	EU	Copenhagen (Denmark)	Transfer	Summer	2018	£7,500,000	BBC Sport
12	DF	(England)	John Brayford	25	EU	Derby County (England)	Transfer	Summer	2017	£1,500,000	BBC Sport
33	GK	(England)	Simon Moore	23	EU	Brentford (England)	Transfer	Summer	2017	£150,000	BBC Sport
4	DF	(England)	Steven Caulker	21	EU	Tottenham Hotspur (England)	Transfer	Summer	2017	£8,000,000	Sky Sports
8	MF	(Chile)	Gary Medel	26	EU	Sevilla (Spain)	Transfer	Summer	2017	£9,500,000	BBC Sport
30	DF	(Uruguay)	Maximiliano Amondarain	20	EU	Free agent	Transfer	Summer	2017	Free	Sky Sports
28	DF	(France)	Kévin Théophile-Catherine	23	EU	Rennes (France)	Transfer	Summer	2017	£2,100,000	BBC Sport
11	FW	(Nigeria)	Peter Odemwingie	32	EU	West Bromwich Albion (England)	Transfer	Summer	2015	£2,250,000	BBC Sport
15	MF	(Norway)	Magnus Wolff Eikrem	23	EU	Heerenveen (Netherlands)	Transfer	Winter	2016	£2,000,000	Cardiff City
29	MF	(Norway)	Mats Møller Dæhli	18	EU	Molde (Norway)	Transfer	Winter	2016	Undisclosed	Cardiff City
34	FW	(Norway)	Jo Inge Berget	23	EU	Molde (Norway)	Transfer	Winter	2016	£2,000,000	BBC Sport
9	FW	(Trinidad and Tobago)	Kenwyne Jones	29	Non-EU	Stoke City (England)	Transfer	Winter	2015	Player-exchange	BBC Sport
35	DF	(Brazil)	Fábio	23	Non-EU	Manchester United (England)	Transfer	Winter	2016	Undisclosed	BBC Sport
36	MF	(England) (Ivory Coast)	Wilfried Zaha	21	EU	Manchester United (England)	Loan	Winter	2014	Season Long Loan	BBC Sport
27	DF	(Spain)	Juan Cala	24	EU	Sevilla (Spain)	Transfer	Winter	2016	Free	BBC Sport

- Total spending: ▼ ~ £36,000,000+

Notes

^{1} Although officially undisclosed, Wales Online believed the deal to be worth around £2 million.

=== Out ===
No.	Pos.	Name	Country	Age	Type	Moving to	Transfer window	Transfer fee	Apps	Goals	Source
34	FW	Jesse Darko	(Austria)	20	Contract Ended	Episkopi (Greece)	Summer	Free	0	0	BBC Sport
22	FW	Heiðar Helguson	(Iceland)	35	Contract Ended	Retired	Summer	N/A	39	9	South Wales Echo
33	FW	Nathaniel Jarvis	(Wales)	21	Contract Ended	Brackley Town (England)	Summer	Free	3	2	BBC Sport
37	MF	Stephen McPhail	(Republic of Ireland)	33	Contract Ended	Sheffield Wednesday (England)	Summer	Free	222	3	South Wales Echo
29	GK	Elliott Parish	(England)	23	Contract Ended	Bristol City (England)	Summer	Free	0	0	BBC Sport
15	FW	Rudy Gestede	(Benin) (France)	25	Transfer	Blackburn Rovers (England)	Winter	Undisclosed	64	9	BBC Sport
11	FW	Peter Odemwingie	(Nigeria)	32	Transfer	Stoke City (England)	Winter	Player-Swap	17	2	BBC Sport
22	MF	Craig Conway	(Scotland)	28	Transfer	Blackburn Rovers (England)	Winter	Undisclosed	67	6	BBC Sport
9	FW	Andreas Cornelius	(Denmark)	20	Transfer	Copenhagen (Denmark)	Winter	Undisclosed	11	0	South Wales Echo

EU = if holds or not a European Union passport; Country: when 2 flags, 1st flag = country that plays for internationally, 2nd flag = country of birth; N = number on jersey; P = Position (for position name, pause mouse pointer on abbreviation); Name = Name on jersey (for more extensive name, pause mouse pointer on name); Age = age on the day of the signing; Moving from = only indicate the club the player was playing before start playing for this club in this season, for the type of the moving see Status column; Moving to = only indicates the club the player is going to play next, for the type of the moving see Status column; Ends = when the player's current contract ends; n/a = Not applicable; Apps = Total number of competitive appearances (including substitute appearances) at the club prior to departure; Goals = Total number of competitive goals scored at the club prior to departure.
- Total income: ▲ ~ £Undisclosed

=== Loans out ===
No.	Pos.	Name	Country	Age	Loan club	Started	Ended	Start source	End source
31	DF	Ben Nugent	(England)	20	Brentford	1 August	5 January	BBC Sport	Get West London
21	MF	Joe Ralls	(England)	20	Yeovil Town	14 August	31 May	Sky Sports	
22	MF	Craig Conway	(Scotland)	28	Brighton & Hove Albion	13 September	14 December	Cardiff City Official Site	The Courier
25	DF	Kevin McNaughton	(Scotland)	31	Bolton Wanderers	27 September	1 January	BBC Sport	South Wales Echo
24	DF	Simon Lappin	(Scotland)	30	Sheffield United	4 October	1 January	BBC Sport	Yorkshire Post
40	MF	Kadeem Harris	(England)	20	Brentford	18 October	1 January	BBC Sport	TribalSport
41	DF	Adedeji Oshilaja	(England)	20	Newport County	31 October	6 January	BBC Sport	South Wales Argus
15	FW	Rudy Gestede	(Benin) (France)	25	Blackburn Rovers	26 November	1 January	BBC Sport	South Wales Echo
20	FW	Joe Mason	(Republic of Ireland) (England)	21	Bolton Wanderers	27 November	2 January	BBC Sport	The Bolton News
26	MF	Filip Kiss	(Slovakia)	23	Ross County	8 January	31 May	BBC Sport	
23	FW	Nicky Maynard	(England)	27	Wigan Athletic	16 January	31 May	BBC Sport	
12	DF	John Brayford	(England)	26	Sheffield United	24 January	31 May	Cardiff City Official site	
33	GK	Simon Moore	(England)	24	Bristol City	29 January	31 May	Bristol City	
—	FW	Etien Velikonja	(Slovakia)	25	Rio Ave	January	31 May		
41	DF	Adedeji Oshilaja	(England)	21	Sheffield Wednesday	7 February	12 March	BBC Sport	BBC Sport
31	DF	Ben Nugent	(England)	20	Peterborough United	13 February	31 May	BBC Sport	
20	FW	Joe Mason	(Republic of Ireland) (England)	22	Bolton Wanderers	20 February	12 April	BBC Sport	Bolton News

Sources: For loan start source see "Start source". For loan end source see "End source".
EU = if holds or not a European Union passport; Country: when 2 flags, 1st flag = country that plays for internationally, 2nd flag = country of birth; No. = number on jersey; P = Position (for position name, pause mouse pointer on abbreviation); Name = Name on jersey (for more extensive name, pause mouse pointer on name); In/Out = In: The player came in on loan, Out: The player went out on loan; Loan club = the club that the player moved on loan to or the club that the player came from on loan; Started = the date when the player's loan started; Ended = the date when the player's loan ended.

== Fixtures and results ==
=== Pre-season ===
24 July	Forest Green Rovers	3–4	Cardiff City	Stroud
19:45 BST	Norwood 44'; Wright 56'; Taylor 77'		Cornelius 21'; Maynard 34'; Whittingham 47' (pen.); Noone 73'	Stadium: The New Lawn

27 July	Cheltenham Town	1–1	Cardiff City	Cheltenham
15:00BST	Brown 8'	Report	26' Kim	Stadium: Abbey Stadium; Attendance: 2,561

30 July	Brentford	3–2	Cardiff City	London
19:45 BST	McAleny 44' McAleny 47' Hayes 88'	Report	Kim 12' Campbell 14'	Stadium: Griffin Park; Attendance: 2954

3 August	Cardiff City	1–0	Chievo	Cardiff
15:00 BST	Kim 57'			Stadium: Cardiff City Stadium; Attendance: 7,097; Referee: Bryn Markham-Jones

10 August	Cardiff City	2–1	Athletic Bilbao	Cardiff
15:00 BST	Whittingham 45'; Campbell 52'	Report	56' Iraola	Stadium: Cardiff City Stadium; Attendance: 10,381

=== 2013–14 Premier League ===
17 August 2013 1	West Ham United	2–0	Cardiff City	London
15:00 BST	Cole 13'; Nolan 76'	Report	(yellow card) 26' Connolly	Stadium: Boleyn Ground; Attendance: 34,977; Referee: Howard Webb (South Yorkshire)

25 August 2013 2	Cardiff City	3–2	Manchester City	Cardiff
16:00 BST	Gunnarsson 60'; Campbell 79', 87'	Report	52' Džeko; 90+2' Negredo	Stadium: Cardiff City Stadium; Attendance: 27,068; Referee: Lee Probert (Wiltshire)

31 August 2013 3	Cardiff City	0–0	Everton	Cardiff
15:00 BST	Connolly (yellow card) 49'	BBC Report	(yellow card) 38' Barkley	Stadium: Cardiff City Stadium; Attendance: 27,344; Referee: Anthony Taylor (Greater Manchester)

14 September 2013 4	Hull City	1–1	Cardiff City	Kingston upon Hull
15:00 BST	Davies 40' (yellow card) 90+2'	BBC Report	(yellow card) 20' Campbell; (yellow card) 54' Turner; 59' Whittingham	Stadium: KC Stadium; Attendance: 21,949; Referee: Robert Madley

22 September 2013 5	Cardiff City	0–1	Tottenham Hotspur	Cardiff
16:00 BST	Turner (yellow card) 63'	BBC	(yellow card) 7' Walker; (yellow card) 47' Townsend; (yellow card) 70' Dawson; 90+2' Paulinho; (yellow card) 90+4' Soldado	Stadium: Cardiff City Stadium; Attendance: 27,815; Referee: Mark Clattenburg (Northumberland)

28 September 2013 6	Fulham	1–2	Cardiff City	London
15:00 BST	Ruiz 45'; Berbatov (yellow card) 64'	BBC Report	12' Caulker; (yellow card) 32' Théophile-Catherine; 90+2' Mutch	Stadium: Craven Cottage; Attendance: 23,020; Referee: Craig Pawson

5 October 2013 7	Cardiff City	1–2	Newcastle United	Cardiff
15:00 BST	Odemwingie 58'; Gunnarsson (yellow card) 90'	BBC Report	30', 38' Rémy	Stadium: Cardiff City Stadium; Attendance: 27,583; Referee: Kevin Friend (Leicestershire)

19 October 2013 8	Chelsea	4–1	Cardiff City	London
15:00 BST	Hazard 33', 82'; David Luiz (yellow card) 40'; Eto'o 66'; Oscar 78'	BBC Report	10' Mutch; (yellow card) 45' Cowie; (yellow card) 54' Marshall	Stadium: Stamford Bridge; Attendance: 41,475; Referee: Anthony Taylor (Greater Manchester)

26 October 2013 9	Norwich City	0–0	Cardiff City	Norwich
15:00 BST	Alexander Tettey (yellow card) 58'	BBC Report	(yellow card) 22' Odemwingie	Stadium: Carrow Road; Attendance: 26,846; Referee: Mike Jones (Cheshire)

3 November 2013 10	Cardiff City	1–0	Swansea City	Cardiff
16:00 GMT	Caulker 62'; Whittingham (yellow card) 86'	BBC Report	(red card) 90+1' Vorm	Stadium: Cardiff City Stadium; Attendance: 27,463; Referee: Mike Dean (Cheshire)

9 November 2013 11	Aston Villa	2–0	Cardiff City	Birmingham
15:00 GMT	Bacuna 76'; Kozák 84'	BBC Report		Stadium: Villa Park; Attendance: 35,809; Referee: Martin Atkinson (West Yorkshire)

24 November 2013 12	Cardiff City	2–2	Manchester United	Cardiff
16:00 GMT	Campbell 33'; Caulker (yellow card) 51'; Whittingham (yellow card) 54'; Kim 90+1' (yellow card) 90+2'; Théophile-Catherine (yellow card) 90+3'	BBC Report	(yellow card) 7', (goal) 15' Rooney; 45' Evra; (yellow card) 87' Cleverley	Stadium: Cardiff City Stadium; Attendance: 28,016; Referee: Neil Swarbrick (Lancashire)

30 November 2013 13	Cardiff City	0–3	Arsenal	Cardiff
15:00 GMT		BBC Report	29', 90+3', (yellow card) 89' Ramsey; (yellow card) 33' Gibbs; (yellow card) 79' Arteta; 86' Flamini	Stadium: Cardiff City Stadium; Attendance: 27,948; Referee: Lee Mason (Greater Manchester)

3 December 2013 14	Stoke City	0–0	Cardiff City	Stoke-on-Trent
19:45 GMT	Adam (yellow card) 34'; Crouch (yellow card) 60'	BBC Report; Premier League Report	(yellow card) 60' Campbell; (yellow card) 87' Turner	Stadium: Britannia Stadium; Attendance: 25,014; Referee: Michael Oliver (Northumberland)

7 December 2013 15	Crystal Palace	2–0	Cardiff City	London
15:00 GMT	Jerome 6'; Chamakh 57'	BBC Report; Premier League Report		Stadium: Selhurst Park; Attendance: 23,705; Referee: Mike Jones (Cheshire)

14 December 2013 16	Cardiff City	1–0	West Bromwich Albion	Cardiff
15:00 GMT	Medel (yellow card) 36'; Mutch (yellow card) 63'; Whittingham 65'	BBC Report	(yellow card) 51' Jones	Stadium: Cardiff City Stadium; Attendance: 26,632; Referee: Howard Webb (South Yorkshire)

21 December 2013 17	Liverpool	3–1	Cardiff City	Liverpool
15:00 GMT	Suárez 25', 45'; Škrtel (yellow card) 41'; Sterling 42', (yellow card) 72'	BBC Report	58' Mutch	Stadium: Anfield; Attendance: 44,621; Referee: Lee Probert (Wiltshire)

26 December 2013 18	Cardiff City	0–3	Southampton	Cardiff
15:00 GMT	Noone (yellow card) 22'	BBC Report	14', 20' Rodriguez; (yellow card) 25' Shaw; 27' Lambert; (yellow card) 48' Schneiderlin	Stadium: Cardiff City Stadium; Attendance: 27,929; Referee: Andre Marriner (West Midlands)

28 December 2013 19	Cardiff City	2–2	Sunderland	Cardiff
17:30 GMT	Mutch (yellow card) 1' (goal) 6'; Campbell 58' (yellow card) 68'; Kim (yellow card) 58'; Cowie (yellow card) 90'	BBC Report	(yellow card) 19' Cattermole; (yellow card) 60' Bardsley; 83' Fletcher; 90+5' Colback	Stadium: Cardiff City Stadium; Attendance: 27,247; Referee: Chris Foy (Lancashire)

1 January 2014 20	Arsenal	2–0	Cardiff City	London
15:00 GMT	Mertesacker (yellow card) 28'; Bendtner 88'; Walcott 90+2'	BBC Report	(yellow card) 55' Turner; (yellow card) 60' Marshall	Stadium: Emirates Stadium; Attendance: 60,004; Referee: Jonathan Moss (Sunderland)

11 January 2014 21	Cardiff City	0–2	West Ham United	Cardiff
15:00 GMT	Medel (yellow card) 45+10'	Report	42' Cole; (yellow card) 50' McCartney; (yellow card) 61' (yellow-red card) 72' Tomkins; (yellow card) 70' Johnson; (yellow card) 90' Diarra; 90+3' Noble	Stadium: Cardiff City Stadium; Attendance: 27,750; Referee: Lee Mason (Bolton)

18 January 2014 22	Manchester City	4–2	Cardiff City	Manchester
15:00 GMT	Džeko 14'; Negredo (yellow card) 18'; Navas 33'; Kolarov (yellow card) 74'; Touré 76'; Agüero 79'	BBC Report; Premier League Report	29' Noone; 90+3' Campbell	Stadium: City of Manchester Stadium; Attendance: 47,213; Referee: Neil Swarbrick (Preston)

28 January 2014 23	Manchester United	2–0	Cardiff City	Manchester
19:45 GMT	Van Persie 6'; Young 59'	BBC Report; Premier League Report	(yellow card) 21' Bellamy	Stadium: Old Trafford; Attendance: 75,301; Referee: Craig Pawson

1 February 2014 24	Cardiff City	2–1	Norwich City	Cardiff
15:00 GMT	Bellamy 49'; Jones 51'; Noone (yellow card) 59'	BBC Report; Premier League Report	5' Snodgrass; (yellow card) 13' Bennett; (yellow card) 24' Elmander; (yellow card) 32' Tettey; (yellow card) 90' Snodgrass	Stadium: Cardiff City Stadium; Attendance: 26,748; Referee: Mark Clattenburg (Northumberland)

8 February 2014 25	Swansea City	3–0	Cardiff City	Swansea
17:30 GMT	Routledge 47'; Dyer 79'; Bony 85'	BBC Report; Premier League Report		Stadium: Liberty Stadium; Attendance: 20,402; Referee: Andre Marriner (Birmingham)

11 February 2014 26	Cardiff City	0–0	Aston Villa	Cardiff
19:45 GMT		BBC Report; Premier League Report		Stadium: Cardiff City Stadium; Attendance: 27,597; Referee: Chris Foy (St Helens)

22 February 2014 27	Cardiff City	0–4	Hull City	Cardiff
15:00 GMT	Zaha (yellow card) 33'	BBC Report	18' Huddlestone; 38', 57' Jelavić; 67' Livermore; (yellow card) 86' Boyd	Stadium: Cardiff City Stadium; Attendance: 26,167; Referee: Howard Webb (Rotherham)

2 March 2014 28	Tottenham Hotspur	1–0	Cardiff City	London
16:30 GMT	Soldado 28'; Sandro (yellow card) 88'	BBC Report	(yellow card) 12' Kim; (yellow card) 12' Bellamy; (yellow card) 90+5' Cala	Stadium: White Hart Lane; Attendance: 35,312; Referee: Phil Dowd (Stoke-on-Trent)

8 March 2014 29	Cardiff City	3–1	Fulham	Cardiff
15:00 GMT	Caulker 45', 67'; Kim (yellow card) 12'; Riether 71' (o.g.)	BBC Report	59' Holtby	Stadium: Cardiff City Stadium; Attendance: 26,796; Referee: Martin Atkinson (West Yorkshire)

15 March 2014 30	Everton	2–1	Cardiff City	Liverpool
15:00 GMT	Osman (yellow card) 58'; Deulofeu 59'; Coleman 90'	BBC Report	(yellow card) 45' Théophile-Catherine; (yellow card) 58' Medel; 68' Cala; (yellow card) 76' Campbell	Stadium: Goodison Park; Attendance: 38,018; Referee: Roger East

22 March 2014 31	Cardiff City	3–6	Liverpool	Cardiff
15:00 GMT	Mutch 9', 88'; Campbell 25'; Cala (yellow card) 33'; Fábio (yellow card) 50'	Report	(yellow card) 2' Gerrard; 18', 60', 90+6' Suárez; 41', 54' (yellow card) 90+2' Škrtel; 75' Sturridge; (yellow card) 90+4' Allen	Stadium: Cardiff City Stadium; Attendance: 28,018; Referee: Neil Swarbrick (Lancashire)

29 March 2014 32	West Bromwich Albion	3–3	Cardiff City	West Bromwich
15:00 GMT	Amalfitano 2'; Dorrans 9' (yellow card) 64'; Thievy 90+4'	Report	31' Mutch; 73' Caulker; (yellow card) 78' Bellamy; 90+5' Dæhli	Stadium: The Hawthorns; Attendance: 25,661; Referee: Michael Oliver (Northumberland)

5 April 2014 33	Cardiff City	0–3	Crystal Palace	Cardiff
15:00 BST	Turner (yellow card) 68'; Medel (yellow card) 70'	BBC Report	31', 88' Puncheon; (yellow card) 35' Jerome; (yellow card) 38' Ward; 71' (yellow card) 78' Ledley	Stadium: Cardiff City Stadium; Attendance: 27,687; Referee: Phil Dowd (Staffordshire)

12 April 2014 34	Southampton	0–1	Cardiff City	Southampton
15:07 BST		Report	65' Cala	Stadium: St Mary's Stadium; Attendance: 30,526; Referee: Jonathan Moss (Tyne and Wear)

19 April 2014 35	Cardiff City	1–1	Stoke City	Cardiff
15:00 BST	Whittingham 51' (pen.); Mutch (yellow card) 66'; Cala (yellow card) 74'	Report	45+3' (pen.) Arnautović; (yellow card) 48' Odemwingie; (yellow card) 52' Nzonzi; (yellow card) 85' Crouch	Stadium: Cardiff City Stadium; Attendance: 27,686; Referee: Howard Webb (West Riding of Yorkshire)

27 April 2014 36	Sunderland	4–0	Cardiff City	Sunderland
12:00 BST	Wickham 26', 86'; Vergini (yellow card) 37'; Borini 45+1' (pen.), (yellow card) 88'; Larsson (yellow card) 54'; Giaccherini 76', (yellow card) 77'; Gardner (yellow card) 90+4'	Report	(yellow card) 37' Mutch; (yellow card) 39' Medel; (red card) 45' Cala; (yellow card) 53' Fábio	Stadium: Stadium of Light; Attendance: 42,397; Referee: Phil Dowd (Staffordshire)

3 May 2014 37	Newcastle United	3–0	Cardiff City	Newcastle
15:00 BST	Sh. Ameobi 18'; Debuchy (yellow card) 68'; Rémy 87'; Taylor 90+1'	Report		Stadium: St James' Park; Attendance: 50,239; Referee: Martin Atkinson (West Riding County)

11 May 2014 38	Cardiff City	1–2	Chelsea	Cardiff
15:00 BST	Azpilicueta 15' (o.g.); Whittingham (yellow card) 51'	Report	(yellow card) 33' Mikel; 72' Schürrle; 75' Torres; (yellow card) 88' Matić	Stadium: Cardiff City Stadium; Attendance: 27,716; Referee: Michael Oliver (Northumberland)

=== FA Cup ===
4 January 2014 3rd round	Newcastle United	1–2	Cardiff City	Newcastle upon Tyne
15:00 GMT	Cissé 62'; Taylor (yellow card) 69'	BBC Sport	(yellow card) 42' Gunnarsson; 73' Noone; 80' Campbell	Stadium: St James' Park; Attendance: 31,166; Referee: Anthony Taylor (Wythenshawe)

25 January 2014 4th round	Bolton Wanderers	0–1	Cardiff City	Bolton
15:00 GMT	Lee (yellow card) 12'; Danns (yellow card) 37'; Spearing (yellow card) 84'; Baptiste (yellow card) 90+3'	Report	50', (yellow card) 90+3' Campbell; (yellow card) 81' Hudson; (yellow card) 86' Kim	Stadium: Reebok Stadium; Attendance: 12,750; Referee: Jonathan Moss (Tyne and Wear)

15 February 2014 5th round	Cardiff City	1–2	Wigan Athletic	Cardiff
15:00 GMT	Campbell 27'	Report	McCann 18', (yellow card) 73'; Watson 40'; Beausejour (yellow card) 65'	Stadium: Cardiff City Stadium; Attendance: 17,123; Referee: Martin Atkinson

=== League Cup ===
28 August 2013 2nd round	Accrington Stanley	0–2	Cardiff City	Accrington
19:45 BST	Liddle (yellow card) 40'; Clark (yellow card) 71'	BBC Report	61' Maynard; 62' Gestede; (yellow card) 81' Conway	Stadium: Crown Ground; Attendance: 1,617; Referee: David Webb

24 September 2013 3rd round	West Ham United	3–2	Cardiff City	London
19:45 BST	Morrison 1'; Jarvis 8'; Vaz Tê 88'	BBC Report	45' Noone; 76' Odemwingie	Stadium: Boleyn Ground; Attendance: 18,611; Referee: Roger East

== Overall summary ==
=== Summary ===
Games played	43 (38 Premier League, 3 FA Cup, 2 League Cup)
Games won	10 (7 Premier League, 2 FA Cup, 1 League Cup)
Games drawn	9 (9 Premier League, 0 FA Cup, 0 League Cup)
Games lost	24 (22 Premier League, 1 FA Cup, 1 League Cup)
Goals scored	40 (32 Premier League, 4 FA Cup, 4 League Cup)
Goals conceded	80 (74 Premier League, 3 FA Cup, 3 League Cup)
Goal difference	−40
Clean sheets	9 (7 Premier League, 1 FA Cup, 1 League Cup)
Yellow cards	55 (50 Premier League, 4 FA Cup, 1 League Cup)
Red cards	1 (1 Premier League, 0 FA Cup, 0 League Cup)
Worst discipline	Ben Turner (6 (yellow card) , 0 (red card) )
Best result	3–1 vs Fulham
Worst result	0–4 vs Hull City, Sunderland
Most appearances	Campbell, Marshall (40)
Top scorer	Fraizer Campbell (9 goals)
Points	30

=== Score overview ===
Opposition	Home score	Away score	Double
Arsenal	0–3	0–2	No
Aston Villa	0–0	0–2	No
Chelsea	1–2	1–4	No
Crystal Palace	0–3	0–2	No
Everton	0–0	1–2	No
Fulham	3–1	2–1	Yes
Hull City	0–4	1–1	No
Liverpool	3–6	1–3	No
Manchester City	3–2	2–4	No
Manchester United	2–2	0–2	No
Newcastle United	1–2	0–3	No
Norwich City	2–1	0–0	No
Southampton	0–3	1–0	No
Stoke City	1–1	0–0	No
Sunderland	2–2	0–4	No
Swansea City	1–0	0–3	No
Tottenham Hotspur	0–1	0–1	No
West Bromwich Albion	1–0	3–3	No
West Ham United	0–2	0–2	No

== Development squad ==
No.	Name	Pos.	Nat.	Place of Birth	Age	Apps	Goals	Date signed	Ends
Goalkeepers
42	Ben Wilson	GK	(England)	Stanley	21	0	0	November 2013	2015
	Dave Richards	GK	(Wales)	Abergavenny	20	0	0	1 July 2013	2014
Defenders
30	Maximiliano Amondarain	CB	(Uruguay)	Montevideo	21	0	0	30 August 2013	2017
31	Ben Nugent	CB	(England)	Welwyn Garden City	21	14	1	1 July 2012	2016
37	Tom James	CB	(Wales)	Cardiff	18	1	0	April 2014	2016
41	Deji Oshilaja	CB	(England)	London	21	2	0	3 April 2012	Undisclosed
52	Luke Coulson	LB	(England)	St Helens	20	1	0	2 November 2012	2014
	Kane Owen	LB	(Wales)		19	0	0	1 July 2013	2015
	Josh Yorwerth	CB	(Wales)	Bridgend	19	0	0	1 July 2013	2015
Midfielders
40	Kadeem Harris	RW	(England)	Westminster	21	1	0	30 January 2012	2015
	Jaye Bowen	CM	(Wales)		19	0	0	1 July 2013	2015
	Ronnie Hawkins	CM	(Republic of Ireland)		19	0	0	2 November 2012	2014
	Tommy O'Sullivan	CM	(Wales)	Mountain Ash	19	2	0	23 April 2012	2016
	Theo Wharton	CM	(Wales)	Cwmbran	19	2	0	29 March 2012	2014
Forwards
46	Rhys Healey	CF	(England)	Manchester	19	1	0	28 January 2013	2017
	Dane Griffiths	CF	(Wales)		19	0	0	1 July 2013	2014
	Gethyn Hill	CF	(Wales)	Pontypool	19	0	0	1 July 2013	2015

=== Under 21 Premier League Group 2 ===
Match	Date	Opponent	Venue	Result	Cardiff City Scorers	Opposition Scorers	Report
1	19 Aug 13	Ipswich Town	A	2–0	Velikonja (19), Healey (45)		
2	3 Sep 13	Crystal Palace	A	2–1	Kiss (51 pen), Healey (76)	Dymond (44 pen)	
3	16 Sep 13	Swansea City	H	1–0	Harris (64)		
4	7 Oct 13	Queens Park Rangers	A	2–3	Healey (17, 30)	Hitchcock (1, 20), Petrasso (75)	
5	4 Oct 13	Brentford	H	3–1	Gestede (41, 87), Healey (73)	Norris (70)	
6	21 Oct 13	Millwall	H	1–0	Healey (58)		Report
7	4 Nov 13	Brighton & Hove Albion	A	1–0	O'Sullivan		
8	16 Dec 13	Charlton Athletic	A	2–5			
9	13 Jan 14	Crystal Palace	H	2–1	Healey (46), Cornelius (90))	Kaikai (6)	
10	20 Jan 14	Swansea City	A	3–1	Healey (6, 26), Tancock (22 og)	Donnelly (80)	
11	3 Feb 14	Queens Park Rangers	H	2–2	Healey (19), Dæhli (45)	Petrasso (22, 33)	
12	17 Feb 14	Bristol City	A	2–2	Healey (49), Griffiths (63)	Burns (5, 71 pen)	

=== Under 21 FA Cup ===
Match	Date	Opponent	Venue	Result	Cardiff City Scorers	Opposition Scorers	Report
1	29 Oct 13	Brighton & Hove Albion	A	4–3 (AET)	Healey (28, 120), Kiss (89), O'Sullivan (120)	March (22), Barker (59), Harris (92)	
2	6 Dec 13	Chelsea	H	0–4		Baker (13), Wilson (48 og), Kiwomya (55), Boga (67)	

== Club staff ==
=== Backroom staff ===
Position	Name
First-team manager	Ole Gunnar Solskjær
Assistant manager	Mark Dempsey
Goalkeeping coach	Richard Hartis
First-team coach	Danny Keough
Head of Conditioning	René Skovdahl
Senior Physiotherapist	Sean Connelly MSCP SRP
Assistant First Team Physiotherapist	Adam Rattenberry MCSP SRP
Strength & Conditioning Coach	Callum Walsh
Club doctor	Dr. Len Nokes
Chief Scout	John Vik
Club Scout	Mark Stow
Opposition Analyst	Martin Hodge
Performance analyst	Enda Barron
Recruitment analyst	Graham Younger
Kit & equipment manager	Ian Lenning

=== Board of directors ===
Position	Name
Chairman	(Cyprus) Mehmet Dalman
Chief Executive	(Malaysia) Simon Lim
Finance Director	(Wales) Richard Thompson
Non-Executive; Board Members; Football Club	(Wales) Steve Borley (Malaysia) Derek Chee Seng Chin (England) Paul Guy (Malaysia) Len Wing Kong (Malaysia) Meng Kwong Lim (Wales) Michael Isaac (Malaysia) Vincent Lye Ek Seang
Non-Executive; Board Members; Cardiff City (Holdings)	(Cyprus) Mehmet Dalman; Danni Rais
