= Nicky Maynard =

English footballer

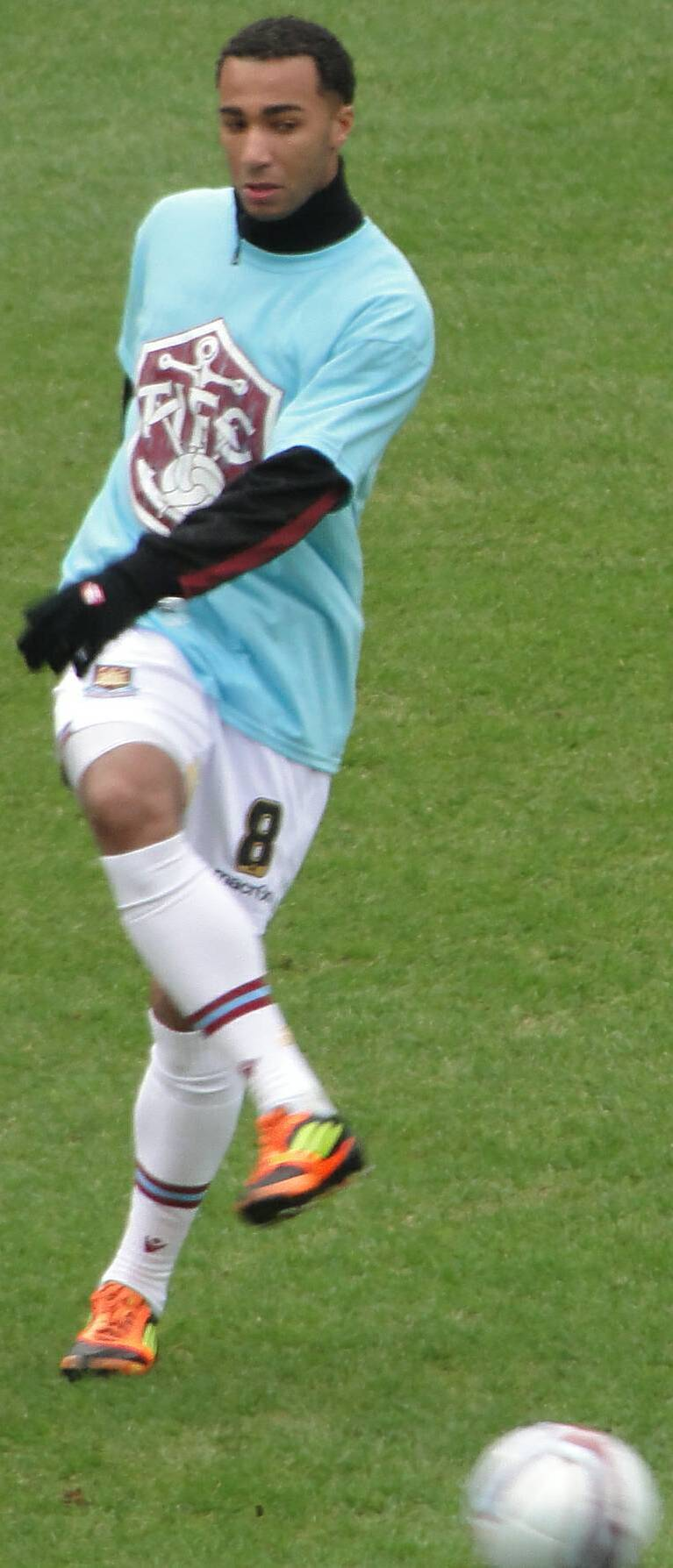
- Maynard warming up for West Ham United in 2012

Personal information
- Full name: Nicholas David Maynard
- Date of birth: 11 December 1986 (age 39)
- Place of birth: Winsford, England
- Height: 5 ft 11 in (1.80 m)
- Position: Striker

Youth career
- 1994: Arsenal
- 1994–2005: Crewe Alexandra

Senior career*
Years	Team	Apps	(Gls)
2005–2008	Crewe Alexandra	59	(32)
2006	→ Witton Albion (loan)	9	(2)
2008–2012	Bristol City	124	(45)
2012	West Ham United	14	(2)
2012–2015	Cardiff City	22	(2)
2014	→ Wigan Athletic (loan)	16	(4)
2015–2017	Milton Keynes Dons	66	(8)
2017–2018	Aberdeen	18	(0)
2018–2019	Bury	37	(21)
2019–2021	Mansfield Town	50	(17)
2021	→ Newport County (loan)	19	(2)
2021–2022	Tranmere Rovers	10	(1)
2022–2023	Macclesfield	33	(15)
2023	Winsford Town	3	(2)
Total		480	(153)
- * Club domestic league appearances and goals as of 03:58, 9 August 2025 (GMT+7)

Nicholas David Maynard (born 11 December 1986) is an English former professional footballer who played as a striker.

He began his career at Crewe Alexandra, following over a decade in the club's Academy, and scored on his senior debut in April 2006 following a successful loan spell at Witton Albion He was named as League One Player of the Month for September 2006 and would score 31 goals in 58 League One games for the club. He was sold to Bristol City for a fee of £2.25m in July 2008. He won the Football League Goal of the Year award for 2009 and would score 45 goals in 124 Championship matches across just under four seasons, becoming the division's joint-top-scorer in 2010. He was sold to West Ham United for an undisclosed fee in January 2012 and was an unused substitute in the club's play-off final, though did not feature in a Premier League match. He joined Cardiff City for a reported £2.75m fee in August 2012. He picked up a serious injury early in the 2012–13 promotion season and was limited to eight Premier League appearances in the following campaign. He spent the second half of the 2013–14 season on loan at Wigan Athletic. He signed with Milton Keynes Dons in September 2015 and would go on to spend two seasons at the club. He spent the 2017–18 campaign at Scottish Premiership side Aberdeen and the 2018–19 season with Bury. He joined Mansfield Town in July 2019.

== Career ==
=== Crewe Alexandra ===
Born in Winsford, Cheshire, Maynard spent a year as a schoolboy with Arsenal, before he joined Crewe Alexandra's academy at the age of seven. He then represented Crewe at every age group level and scored 27 goals in one season at under–18s level. As a reward for his form in the youth team, Maynard was given his first professional contract in the summer of 2005.

Maynard was loaned out to Northern Premier League Premier Division club Witton Albion in November 2005, scoring two goals in nine games, before returning to Crewe in January. He made his Crewe debut in the last game of the 2005–06 Championship season, coming on as a substitute for Michael Higdon in a 4–2 win over Millwall at the Alexandra Stadium on 30 April 2006. He scored with his first touch in professional football, in front of scouts representing 20 different clubs, after Michael O'Connor's shot hit the post.

Maynard performed well in his second year of professional football, forming a productive goal-scoring partnership with Luke Varney, with the pair claiming a total of 33 League One goals between them. During his first full season, Maynard also picked up the "Player of the Month" award for September, scoring four goals in seven games, including one in the 2–0 win over Premier League side Wigan Athletic in the League Cup.

However his second full season was brought to a standstill for four months after he suffered a bone fracture of his fibula and also damaged his ankle ligaments during the season opener against Brighton & Hove Albion. In an interview with FourFourTwo magazine, Maynard admitted that he had "broke down a few times" during his four months of rehabilitation, although he would later recover and return to fitness. Maynard initially struggled to score upon his return to the first team, with only two goals scored in his first two months back from injury. But in February and March, the young striker showed his potential by scoring in seven consecutive games, including a first senior level hat-trick, against relegation rivals Cheltenham Town. "I've scored a couple of doubles before" he said in an interview in 2008, "so I thought it was a long time coming. I got all the lads to sign the match ball for me." Crewe managed to avoid relegation for the second time in three seasons at the expense of AFC Bournemouth, despite losing 4–1 to Oldham Athletic on the last day of the season. He was the subject of a £1 million transfer bid from Ipswich Town, whilst numerous other clubs were also linked with a move for the 21-year old. The bid was rejected as Crewe manager Steve Holland stated that it was half what the "Railwaymen" believed his current valuation to be.

=== Bristol City ===
On 31 July 2008, Maynard signed a four-year contract with Bristol City for a fee of £2.25m (plus a 20% sell on clause), becoming their record signing. The first half of his season at City was difficult and despite scoring three games into his Bristol City career he failed to hold down a regular first-team place, often appearing as a substitute. However, just before Christmas he started scoring, with goals against Watford (twice) and Wolverhampton Wanderers, starting a Bristol City unbeaten run of eight games, which was ended by a 1–0 defeat by Doncaster Rovers.

Maynard made an explosive start to his second season with City, scoring six times in his first seven games. He helped his side to three consecutive 1–0 victories, against Crystal Palace, Queens Park Rangers and away at Brentford in the League Cup. He also scored twice in a 2–1 defeat of Middlesbrough. Maynard's sixth goal of the season came on 12 September away at Coventry City; after the ball was chested down by new signing and strike partner Álvaro Saborío, Maynard struck a 25-yard half-volley in off the crossbar past Coventry keeper Keiren Westwood. "Robins" manager Gary Johnson said that "he's got some good ones this season but that might just be his best one." However, Maynard bettered this goal on Boxing day against Queens Park Rangers at Loftus Road; facing away from goal just outside the box, he collected a bouncing ball in the air, controlled it with one touch, turned two defenders with a second touch, and then smashed a volley into the top corner past an unmoved Radek Černý, all without the ball hitting the ground. The goal was voted the 'Football League goal of 2009', out of five selected goals from 2009.

Following a pre-season knee injury, his first appearance in the 2010–11 season was as a substitute against Leeds United on 12 February. He scored six goals in eight games and entered negotiations with the club on a new contract, with manager Keith Millen saying that the player was "happy to be back playing again, fit and scoring goals and we're delighted to have him". On 23 April, Maynard received the first red card of his career for a two-footed tackle in a 3–2 defeat at Sheffield United. In May 2011, it was reported that Guyana had approached Maynard for a possible call-up to the senior side, whom he qualifies for through his grandparents. He had previously been tipped to represent England by Crewe manager Dario Gradi, who felt it unlikely that he would be selected "from a club like Bristol City".

Bristol City rejected a transfer bid from Leicester City in June 2011, whilst Nottingham Forest and Southampton also made enquiries. However as negotiations failed to produce a new contract he sought to ease fans concerns, saying that he was committed to the club and that "my aim is to be the top scorer in the league and get Bristol City into the Premier League"; he set a target of 20 goals for the coming season. Maynard was put up for sale in the January 2012 transfer window after failing to negotiate a new contract at Ashton Gate. He stated in an interview with BBC Radio Bristol that fans had thrown bottles at his family, which made him even more reluctant to sign a new deal.

=== West Ham United ===
On 31 January 2012, Maynard signed for Championship club West Ham United for an undisclosed fee on a 2 1/2-year deal with an option for an extra year. Maynard made his West Ham debut on 14 February in a 1–1 draw with Southampton at the Boleyn Ground, coming on as a 65th-minute substitute for Carlton Cole. Seven days later, Maynard netted his first goal for the "Hammers" in a 4–1 win at Blackpool. He scored his second goal for West Ham in a 4–0 win at Barnsley on 6 April. He also scored in the play-off semi-final second leg against Cardiff City on 7 May, giving West Ham a 3–0 lead at the time to add to their 2–0 lead from the first leg, putting them through to the final at Wembley. He was an unused substitute in the play-off final as West Ham secured promotion to the Premier League with a 2–1 victory over Blackpool. His final game for West Ham came in the League Cup on 28 August 2012, when he scored the first goal in a 2–0 win over former club Crewe Alexandra. He played 17 games in all competitions, scoring four goals, though did not feature in the Premier League under manager Sam Allardyce.

=== Cardiff City ===
On 31 August 2012, Maynard signed a three-year contract with Cardiff City for an undisclosed transfer fee, reported to be £2.75m. His debut came on 2 September, in a 3–1 win over Wolverhampton Wanderers. Just two games later, Maynard was ruled out for the season with a torn anterior cruciate ligament. Speaking in January, manager Malky Mackay confirmed that Maynard would not play for Cardiff again in the 2012–13 season. He did though feature on the final day of the season, scoring a stoppage-time equaliser in a 2–2 draw at Hull City; the draw secured promotion for Hull, with Cardiff already having secured promotion to the Premier League as winners of the Championship.

Maynard scored his second goal for the "Bluebirds" in a 2–0 League Cup win at Accrington Stanley on 28 August 2013. On 16 January 2014, Maynard joined Wigan Athletic on loan until the end of the 2013–14 season. He scored his first goals for Wigan when he struck twice in a 3–0 win against Sheffield Wednesday on 11 February. Manager Uwe Rösler enthused that "he was excellent, not only his goals, but his all-round play... he looks sharp, motivated and knowledgeable about the game". Maynard scored four goals in 18 games for the "Latics", who qualified for the play-offs with a fifth-place finish in the Championship. However he played just 15 minutes of the play-off semi-finals as Wigan were beaten 2–1 on aggregate by Queens Park Rangers.

Cardiff returned to the Championship after being relegated in his absence and though Maynard only featured five times under manager Ole Gunnar Solskjær, he described the Norwegian as "a breath of fresh air" and that he was "devastated" by Solskjær's departure from the Cardiff City Stadium. He was limited to one goal from 12 games during the 2014–15 season and was released by manager Russell Slade upon the expiry of his contract, having been sidelined from November to April with a back injury.

=== Milton Keynes Dons ===
On 22 September 2015, Maynard signed for newly-promoted Championship side Milton Keynes Dons on a one-year deal. On 12 May 2016, Maynard was released from Milton Keynes Dons after declining a new contract offered by the club. Maynard had scored six goals in 35 league appearances for the club, leaving as top scorer for the 2015–16 season.

On 2 July 2016, Maynard re-signed for the club on a new one-year deal. Upon re-signing, Maynard said "I'm pleased to be back. I enjoyed my time here last season and I got to know the players and staff well. I wanted to be somewhere where I felt wanted and having spoken to the gaffer quite a bit over the summer, he let me know how much he wanted me here." He struggled for goals during the 2016–17 season, though manager Karl Robinson blamed the team's lack of service. Maynard volunteered to play under-21 games in order to rediscover his scoring touch. His first goal of the campaign, and hundredth career goal, came in a 3–2 win over Swindon Town at Stadium MK on 30 December; manager Robbie Neilson reiterated his predecessors words that the rest of the team had to work harder to provide Maynard with more scoring opportunities. Maynard left the club again on 2 May 2017, following a disappointing season.

=== Aberdeen ===
Maynard signed a one-year contract with Scottish Premiership club Aberdeen in July 2017. He was signed by Derek McInnes, who had also been his manager at Bristol City. Maynard was released by Aberdeen at the end of the 2017–18 season, having failed to find the net in 20 appearances for the "Dons". He later blamed his poor scoring record at Pittodrie on McInnes for not believing in him and giving him enough minutes on the pitch.

=== Bury ===
On 29 September 2018, Maynard joined Bury on a deal initially scheduled to last until January 2019. He made his debut for the "Shakers" on the same day as a substitute for Chris Dagnall in a 2–1 win at Colchester United. The following month, his contract with Bury was extended to the end of the 2018–19 season, with the option to extend it to a further year until 2020. Bury finished as runners-up in League Two and were promoted to League One. Maynard scored 21 league goals, the third highest scorer in the league for the 2018–19 season. Due to doubt regarding the financial situation at Bury, Maynard announced his departure from Gigg Lane in June 2019. Manager Ryan Lowe also left the club and tried to sign him at new club Plymouth Argyle.

=== Mansfield Town ===
On 2 July 2019, Maynard signed with League Two side Mansfield Town. He scored a hat-trick in a 6–1 win over Oldham Athletic at Field Mill on 12 October, leading to manager John Dempster to comment that the best was yet to come for the "Stags" from the veteran striker. Maynard was offered a new contract at the end of the 2019–20 season but became a free agent after talks broke down. He finally signed a new one-year contract with the club on 28 August, though manager Graham Coughlan admitted he was short of match fitness after missing pre-season. On 1 February 2021, Maynard joined League Two side Newport County on loan for the remainder of the 2020-21 season. He scored on his debut for Newport in the 1-0 League Two win against Grimsby Town on 6 February 2021. Maynard played for Newport in the League Two playoff final at Wembley Stadium on 31 May 2021 which Newport lost to Morecambe, 1-0 after a 107th-minute penalty. Maynard was released by Mansfield at the end of the 2020-21 season at the end of his contract.

=== Tranmere Rovers ===
On 31 August 2021, Maynard joined League Two side Tranmere Rovers on a one-year contract, having supposedly turned down offers from League One clubs. Maynard was released by the club at the end of his contract.

=== Macclesfield ===
On 4 August 2022, Maynard signed for Northern Premier League Division One West club Macclesfield.

=== Winsford Town ===
In August 2023, Maynard signed for Winsford Town of the Cheshire Football League League Two.

== Style of play ==
Maynard is a goalscoring striker, boasting good finishing skills and clever movement. In an interview in August 2017, he stated that "Sometimes I can make runs all day and not touch the ball for 15 minutes. It can be frustrating but it's not about me, it is about the team."

== Personal life ==
He lives in Audlem with wife Tara and two sons, Camden and Trey. The wedding took place at Thornton Manor in June 2014.

== Career statistics ==
As of game played 9 August 2025

Appearances and goals by club, season and competition
Club	Season	League			National cup		League cup		Other		Total	
Club	Season	Division	Apps	Goals	Apps	Goals	Apps	Goals	Apps	Goals	Apps	Goals
Crewe Alexandra	2005–06	Championship	1	1	0	0	0	0	0	0	1	1
Crewe Alexandra	2006–07	League One	31	16	0	0	3	2	4 (Note: Appearances in EFL Trophy.)	1	38	19
Crewe Alexandra	2007–08	League One	27	15	1	0	0	0	0	0	28	15
Crewe Alexandra	Total		59	32	1	0	3	2	4	1	67	35
Witton Albion (loan)	2005–06	Northern Premier League Premier Division	9	2	0	0	0	0	0	0	9	2
Bristol City	2008–09	Championship	42	11	1	0	2	0	0	0	45	11
Bristol City	2009–10	Championship	42	20	2	0	1	1	0	0	45	21
Bristol City	2010–11	Championship	13	6	0	0	0	0	0	0	13	6
Bristol City	2011–12	Championship	27	8	1	0	0	0	0	0	28	8
Bristol City	Total		124	45	4	0	3	1	0	0	131	46
West Ham United	2011–12	Championship	14	2	0	0	0	0	2 (Note: Appearances in EFL Championship play-offs.)	1	16	3
West Ham United	2012–13	Premier League	0	0	0	0	1	1	0	0	1	1
West Ham United	Total		14	2	0	0	1	1	2	1	17	4
Cardiff City	2012–13	Championship	4	1	0	0	0	0	0	0	4	1
Cardiff City	2013–14	Premier League	8	0	0	0	2	1	0	0	10	1
Cardiff City	2014–15	Championship	10	1	0	0	2	0	0	0	12	1
Cardiff City	Total		22	2	0	0	4	1	0	0	26	3
Wigan Athletic (loan)	2013–14	Championship	16	4	1	0	0	0	1	0	18	4
Milton Keynes Dons	2015–16	Championship	35	6	2	1	1	0	0	0	38	7
Milton Keynes Dons	2016–17	League One	31	2	2	0	0	0	1	0	34	2
Milton Keynes Dons	Total		66	8	4	1	1	0	1	0	72	9
Aberdeen	2017–18	Scottish Premiership	18	0	1	0	1	0	0	0	20	0
Bury	2018–19	League Two	37	21	2	0	0	0	2	1	41	22
Mansfield Town	2019–20	League Two	33	14	2	1	0	0	0	0	35	15
Mansfield Town	2020–21	League Two	17	3	2	1	0	0	2	0	21	4
Mansfield Town	Total		50	17	4	2	0	0	2	0	56	19
Newport County (loan)	2020–21	League Two	19	2	0	0	0	0	3 (Note: Appearances in EFL League Two play-offs.)	1	22	3
Tranmere Rovers	2021–22	League Two	10	1	1	0	0	0	4	4	15	5
Macclesfield	2022–23	Northern Premier League Division One West	33	15	4	1	–		5 (Note: Four appearances and four goals in FA Trophy, one appearance in Cheshire Senior Cup.)	4	42	20
Winsford Town	2023–24	Cheshire Football League League Two	3	2	0	0	—		0	0	3	2
Career total			480	153	22	4	13	5	24	12	539	174

== Honours ==
West Ham United

- Football League Championship play-offs: 2012

Individual

- Football League Championship Golden Boot: 2009–10
- Football League One Player of the Month: September 2006
- Football League Goal of the Year: 2010
