= Theo Wharton =

Kittian footballer (born 1994)

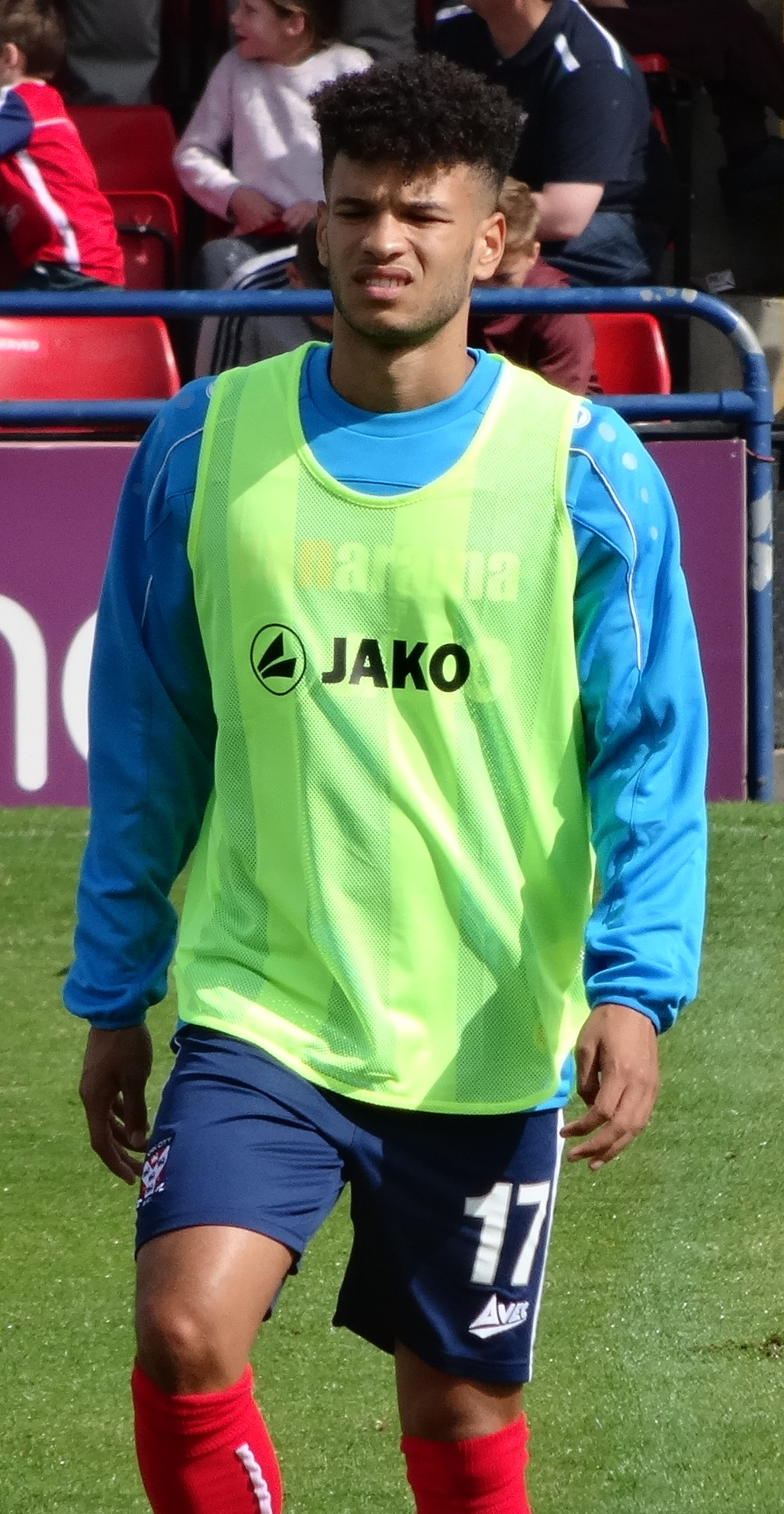
- Wharton warming up for York City in 2017

Personal information
- Full name: Theo Jay Wharton
- Date of birth: 15 November 1994 (age 31)
- Place of birth: Cwmbran, Wales
- Height: 5 ft 10 in (1.78 m)
- Position: Midfielder

Team information
- Current team: Barry Town
- Number: 15

Youth career
- –2012: Cardiff City

Senior career*
Years	Team	Apps	(Gls)
2012–2017	Cardiff City	0	(0)
2017	→ Weston-super-Mare (loan)	4	(0)
2017–2018	York City	7	(0)
2017–2018	→ Tamworth (loan)	4	(0)
2018	Nuneaton Borough	7	(0)
2018–2019	Hereford	12	(0)
2020–2022	Barry Town United	51	(2)
2022–2023	Newtown	13	(0)
2024–2025	Llanelli Town	34	(2)
2026–	Barry Town United	15	(0)

International career^{‡}
2010	Wales U17	2	(0)
2012–2013	Wales U19	2	(0)
2014	Wales U21	1	(0)
2016–	Saint Kitts and Nevis	27	(2)
Medal record
Men's football
Representing Saint Kitts and Nevis
FIFA Series
Bronze medal – third place	2026 Indonesia
- * Club domestic league appearances and goals as of 11:07, 21 September 2026 (UTC) ‡ National team caps and goals as of 5 October 2026

Theo Jay Wharton (born 15 November 1994) is a footballer who plays as a midfielder for Barry Town. Born in Wales, he plays for the Saint Kitts and Nevis national team.

== Early and personal life ==
Wharton was born in Cwmbran, Torfaen, and is the son of former footballer Sean Wharton and godson of former footballer Nathan Blake.

== Club career ==
=== Early career ===
Wharton played for Pontypool-based side Race Juniors and helped the team to Tesco Cup final at the City of Manchester Stadium.

=== Cardiff City ===
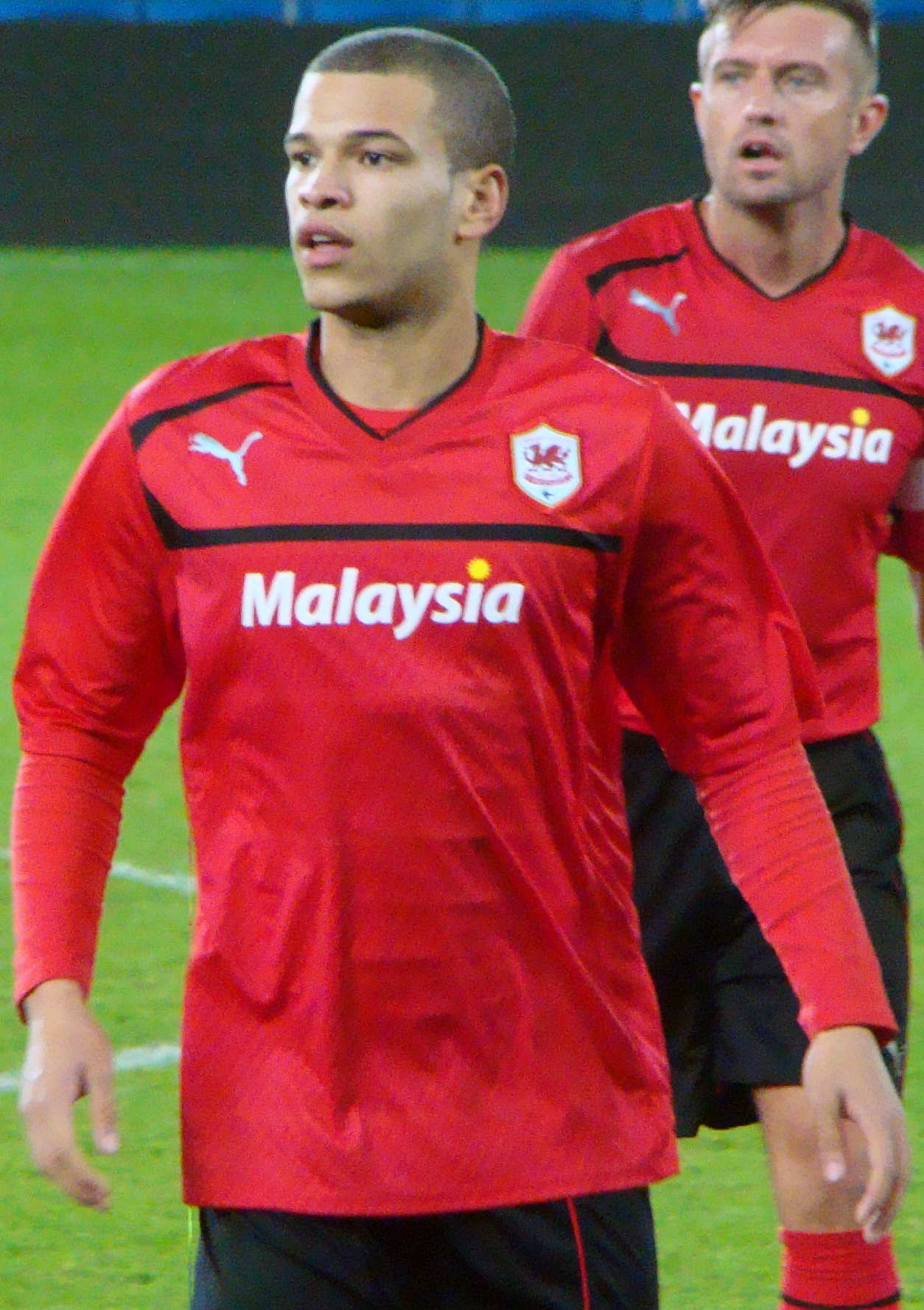
Wharton playing for the Cardiff City development team in 2013

Wharton started his career at Cardiff City, playing for their under-18 side during the 2011–12 season. His impressive form for the youth team resulted in a first-team call up by manager Malky Mackay for the FA Cup game against West Bromwich Albion, in which he came on as a substitute. Following his debut, Mackay admitted that Wharton would train with first team and had a "big future ahead of him". On 29 March 2012, Wharton signed his first professional contract which would keep at Cardiff until at least June 2014.

Wharton joined National League South club Weston-super-Mare on 23 March 2017 on loan.

=== York City and Nuneaton Borough ===
Wharton signed for newly relegated National League North club York City on 30 June 2017 on a one-year contract. He joined York's divisional rivals Tamworth on 22 December 2017 on a one-month loan. Tamworth's attempts to extend his loan for the rest of the season were unsuccessful, and he finished his spell at the club with four appearances. Wharton made nine appearances for York as they finished 2017–18 in 11th place in the table. He was released at the end of the season.

Wharton signed for National League North club Nuneaton Borough in July 2018.

=== Hereford ===
Wharton signed for National League North club Hereford on 22 December 2018.

=== Barry Town United ===
Wharton signed for Cymru Premier club Barry Town United on 13 January 2020.

== International career ==
Wharton was first selected for the Wales national under-17 team for the 2011 UEFA European Under-17 Championship qualifying round, starting two matches against Belgium and Denmark. Wharton was called up to the Wales under-21 team to play Moldova on 22 March 2013. On 9 September 2014, Wharton made his Wales under-21 debut in a 1–1 draw against Lithuania under-21s.

In 2016, Wharton chose to switch allegiance to play for Saint Kitts and Nevis, the country where his grandparents were born. He made his debut for the side on 13 November 2016 in a 2–0 defeat to Haiti.

== Career statistics ==
=== Club ===
As of match played 30 October 2018

Appearances and goals by club, season and competition
Club	Season	League			FA Cup		League Cup		Other		Total	
Club	Season	Division	Apps	Goals	Apps	Goals	Apps	Goals	Apps	Goals	Apps	Goals
Cardiff City	2011–12	Championship	0	0	1	0	0	0	0	0	1	0
Cardiff City	2012–13	Championship	0	0	1	0	0	0	—		1	0
Cardiff City	2013–14	Premier League	0	0	0	0	0	0	—		0	0
Cardiff City	2014–15	Championship	0	0	0	0	0	0	—		0	0
Cardiff City	2015–16	Championship	0	0	0	0	0	0	—		0	0
Cardiff City	2016–17	Championship	0	0	0	0	0	0	—		0	0
Cardiff City	Total		0	0	2	0	0	0	0	0	2	0
Weston-super-Mare (loan)	2016–17	National League South	4	0	—		—		—		4	0
York City	2017–18	National League North	7	0	2	0	—		0	0	9	0
Tamworth (loan)	2017–18	National League North	4	0	—		—		—		4	0
Nuneaton Borough	2018–19	National League North	6	0	1	0	—		0	0	7	0
Career total			21	0	5	0	0	0	0	0	26	0

=== International ===
As of match played 5 October 2026

Appearances and goals by national team and year
National team	Year	Apps	Goals
Saint Kitts and Nevis	2016	1	0
Saint Kitts and Nevis	2017	3	0
Saint Kitts and Nevis	2018	5	2
Saint Kitts and Nevis	2019	6	0
Saint Kitts and Nevis	2020	0	0
Saint Kitts and Nevis	2021	4	0
Saint Kitts and Nevis	2024	2	0
Saint Kitts and Nevis	2025	0	0
Saint Kitts and Nevis	2026	6	0
Total		27	2

As of match played 10 September 2024. Saint Kitts and Nevis score listed first, score column indicates score after each Wharton goal.

International goals by date, venue, cap, opponent, score, result and competition
No.	Date	Venue	Cap	Opponent	Score	Result	Competition	Ref.
1	14 October 2018	Raymond E. Guishard Technical Centre, The Valley, Anguilla	8	Saint Martin	5–0	10–0	2019–20 CONCACAF Nations League qualification	
2	14 October 2018	Raymond E. Guishard Technical Centre, The Valley, Anguilla	8	Saint Martin	10–0	10–0	2019–20 CONCACAF Nations League qualification	

== Honours ==
Saint Kitts and Nevis

- FIFA Series third place: 2026
