= Declan John =

Welsh footballer (born 1995)

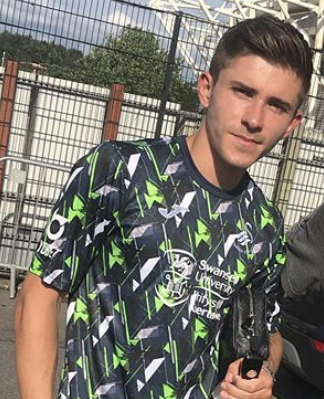
- John with Swansea City in 2019

Personal information
- Full name: Declan Christopher John
- Date of birth: 30 June 1995 (age 31)
- Place of birth: Merthyr Tydfil, Wales
- Position: Left wing-back

Team information
- Current team: St Mirren
- Number: 3

Youth career
- Cardiff City

Senior career*
Years	Team	Apps	(Gls)
2012–2017	Cardiff City	42	(0)
2015	→ Barnsley (loan)	9	(0)
2016	→ Chesterfield (loan)	6	(0)
2017–2018	→ Rangers (loan)	12	(2)
2018	Rangers	14	(1)
2018–2021	Swansea City	11	(0)
2020	→ Sunderland (loan)	0	(0)
2021	→ Bolton Wanderers (loan)	21	(2)
2021–2024	Bolton Wanderers	58	(5)
2023–2024	→ Salford City (loan)	32	(0)
2024–	St Mirren	48	(3)

International career^{‡}
2011–2012	Wales U17	4	(0)
2013	Wales U19	8	(1)
2014–2016	Wales U21	9	(0)
2013–2019	Wales	7	(0)
- * Club domestic league appearances and goals as of 18 May 2026 ‡ National team caps and goals as of 22:00, 20 March 2019 (UTC)

Declan Christopher John (born 30 June 1995) is a Welsh professional footballer who plays as a left wing-back for Scottish Premiership club St Mirren. He also plays for the Wales national team.

== Club career ==
=== Cardiff City ===
Born in Merthyr Tydfil, John progressed through the academy at Cardiff City. His professional debut for Cardiff came on 14 August 2012, in a 2–1 home defeat to Northampton Town in the first round of the Football League Cup. On 5 January 2013, he made his only other appearance of the season, a loss by the same margin at Macclesfield Town in the third round of the FA Cup.

John made his league debut on 17 August 2013 in a 2–0 loss at West Ham United, Cardiff's first game in the Premier League. He signed a long-term contract until 2018 in December. He went on to make 20 appearances that season, appearing more frequently in the second half of the campaign, as the Bluebirds were relegated.

Under new manager, Russell Slade, John fell down the pecking order and was subsequently loaned out to Barnsley for the remainder of the season. He made nine appearances for the Tykes before returning to Cardiff at the end of the season.

After only making a single appearance for Cardiff during the 2015–16 season, John signed for League One side Chesterfield on a month-loan deal in February, where he impressed in six appearances before being recalled by Cardiff on 14 April.

Upon his return to Cardiff, John impressed new manager, Paul Trollope, during pre-season and went on to make his first league start for the club in over a year, where he put in a man of the match performance in a goalless draw against Birmingham City on the opening day of the season. Despite an impressive start to the season, John became a bit-part player under Neil Warnock and was told he could leave the club at the end of the season.

=== Rangers ===
John was loaned to Scottish Premiership club Rangers in August 2017, and the move was made permanent in December.

=== Swansea City ===
On 9 August 2018, John joined Swansea City on a three-year contract. He made his debut for Swansea on 28 August 2018 in the EFL Cup against Crystal Palace.

John signed for Sunderland on a six-month loan on 31 January 2020. He played no matches, and returned to Swansea after the completion of his loan. On 7 January 2021, John joined League Two side Bolton Wanderers on loan for the remainder of the 2020–21 season.

=== Bolton Wanderers ===
On 11 June 2021, Bolton confirmed that John would be re-joining them on a permanent three year deal. John made his second debut for the club on 7 August in a 3–3 draw against MK Dons On 2 April, he started in the 2023 EFL Trophy Final which Bolton won 4–0 against Plymouth Argyle.

On 1 September 2023, John joined Salford City on loan until January 2024. On 22 May 2024, the club confirmed that he would be leaving at the end of his contract on 30 June.

=== St Mirren ===
In November 2024 John joined St Mirren on a short term deal, subsequently extended until the end of the season. On 28 March 2025, John signed a further two-year contract.

John supplied the assist for St Mirren’s third goal in their Scottish League Cup final win against Celtic on 14 December 2025.

== International career ==
John was first called up to the Wales squad for the 2014 FIFA World Cup qualifiers against Macedonia and Serbia, in September 2013. He was an unused substitute in both games. The following month, he retained his place in the squad for the qualifiers against Macedonia and Belgium. On 11 October, John made his debut, playing the whole 90 minutes in the 1–0 win against Macedonia at the Cardiff City Stadium.

== Career statistics ==
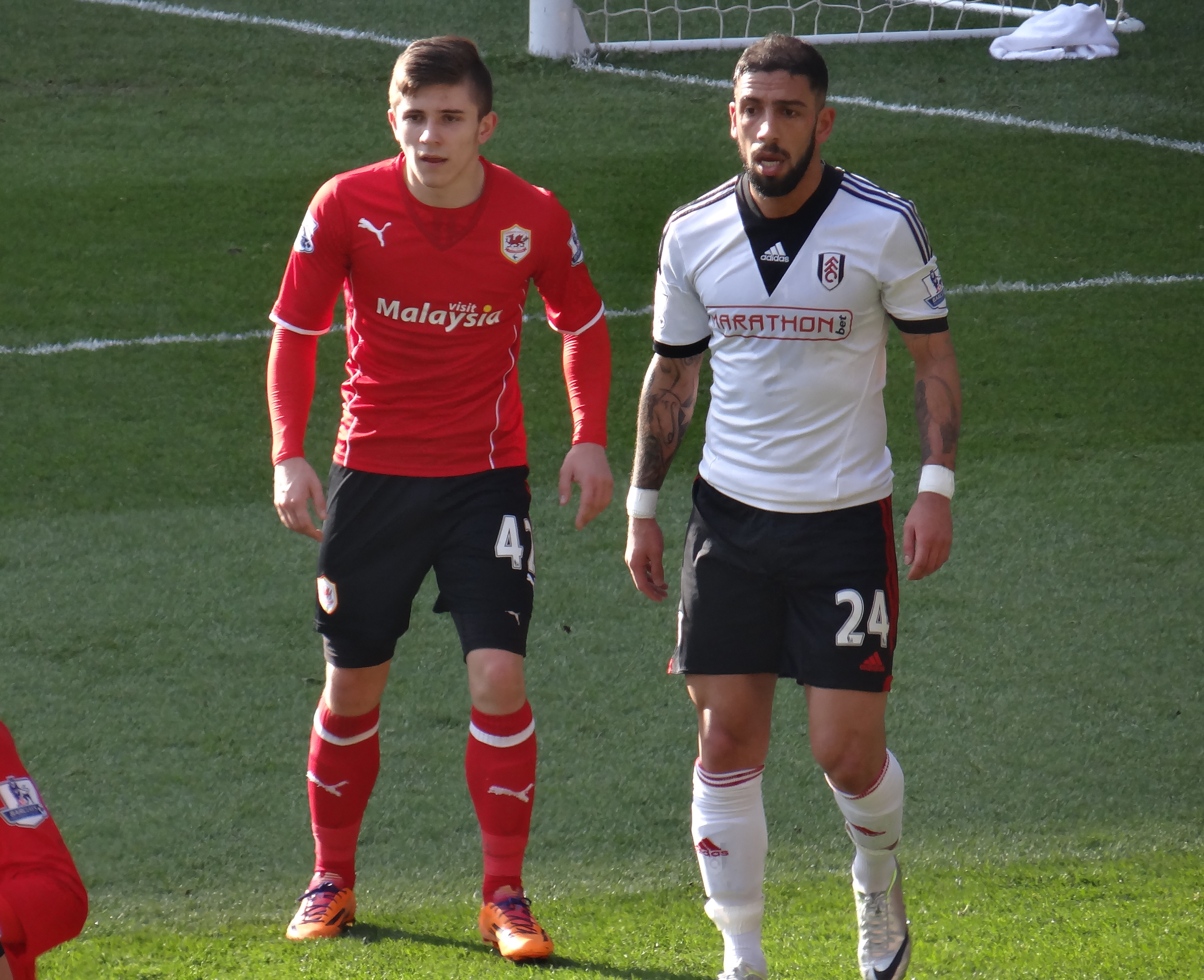
Declan John (left), Ashkan Dejagah (right)

=== Club ===
As of match played 19 May 2023

Appearances and goals by club, season and competition
Club	Season	League			National cup (Note: Includes FA Cup, Scottish Cup)		League cup (Note: Includes Football League Cup, Scottish League Cup)		Other		Total	
Club	Season	Division	Apps	Goals	Apps	Goals	Apps	Goals	Apps	Goals	Apps	Goals
Cardiff City	2012–13	Championship	0	0	1	0	1	0	0	0	2	0
Cardiff City	2013–14	Premier League	20	0	1	0	2	0	0	0	23	0
Cardiff City	2014–15	Championship	6	0	1	0	3	0	0	0	10	0
Cardiff City	2015–16	Championship	1	0	0	0	0	0	0	0	1	0
Cardiff City	2016–17	Championship	15	0	0	0	1	0	0	0	16	0
Cardiff City	2017–18	Championship	0	0	0	0	0	0	0	0	0	0
Cardiff City	Total		42	0	3	0	7	0	0	0	52	0
Barnsley (loan)	2014–15	League One	9	0	0	0	0	0	0	0	9	0
Chesterfield (loan)	2015–16	League One	6	0	0	0	0	0	0	0	6	0
Rangers (loan)	2017–18	Scottish Premiership	12	2	0	0	2	0	0	0	14	2
Rangers	2017–18	Scottish Premiership	14	1	3	0	0	0	0	0	17	1
Rangers	Total		26	3	3	0	2	0	0	0	31	3
Swansea City	2018–19	Championship	10	0	2	0	1	0	0	0	13	0
Swansea City	2019–20	Championship	1	0	1	0	3	0	0	0	5	0
Swansea City	2020–21	Championship	0	0	0	0	0	0	0	0	0	0
Swansea City	Total		11	0	3	0	4	0	0	0	18	0
Sunderland (loan)	2019–20	League One	0	0	0	0	0	0	0	0	0	0
Bolton Wanderers (loan)	2020–21	League Two	21	2	—		—		—		21	2
Bolton Wanderers	2021–22	League One	39	4	2	0	0	0	3 (Note: Appearance(s) in EFL Trophy)	1	44	5
Bolton Wanderers	2022–23	League One	19	1	0	0	2	0	6 (Note: Five appearances in EFL Trophy, one appearance in League One play-offs)	0	27	1
Bolton Wanderers	2023–24	League One	0	0	0	0	0	0	0	0	0	0
Bolton Wanderers	Total		79	7	2	0	2	0	9	1	92	8
Salford City (loan)	2023–24	League Two	12	0	0	0	0	0	1	0	13	0
Career total			170	10	11	0	15	0	10	1	206	11

=== International ===
As of 20 March 2019.

Appearances and goals by national team and year
National team	Year	Apps	Goals
Wales	2013	1	0
Wales	2014	1	0
Wales	2018	4	0
Wales	2019	1	0
Total		7	0

== Honours ==
Bolton Wanderers

- EFL League Two third-place promotion: 2020–21
- EFL Trophy: 2022–23

St Mirren

- Scottish League Cup: 2025–26
