= Mehmet Dalman =

Cypriot investment banker

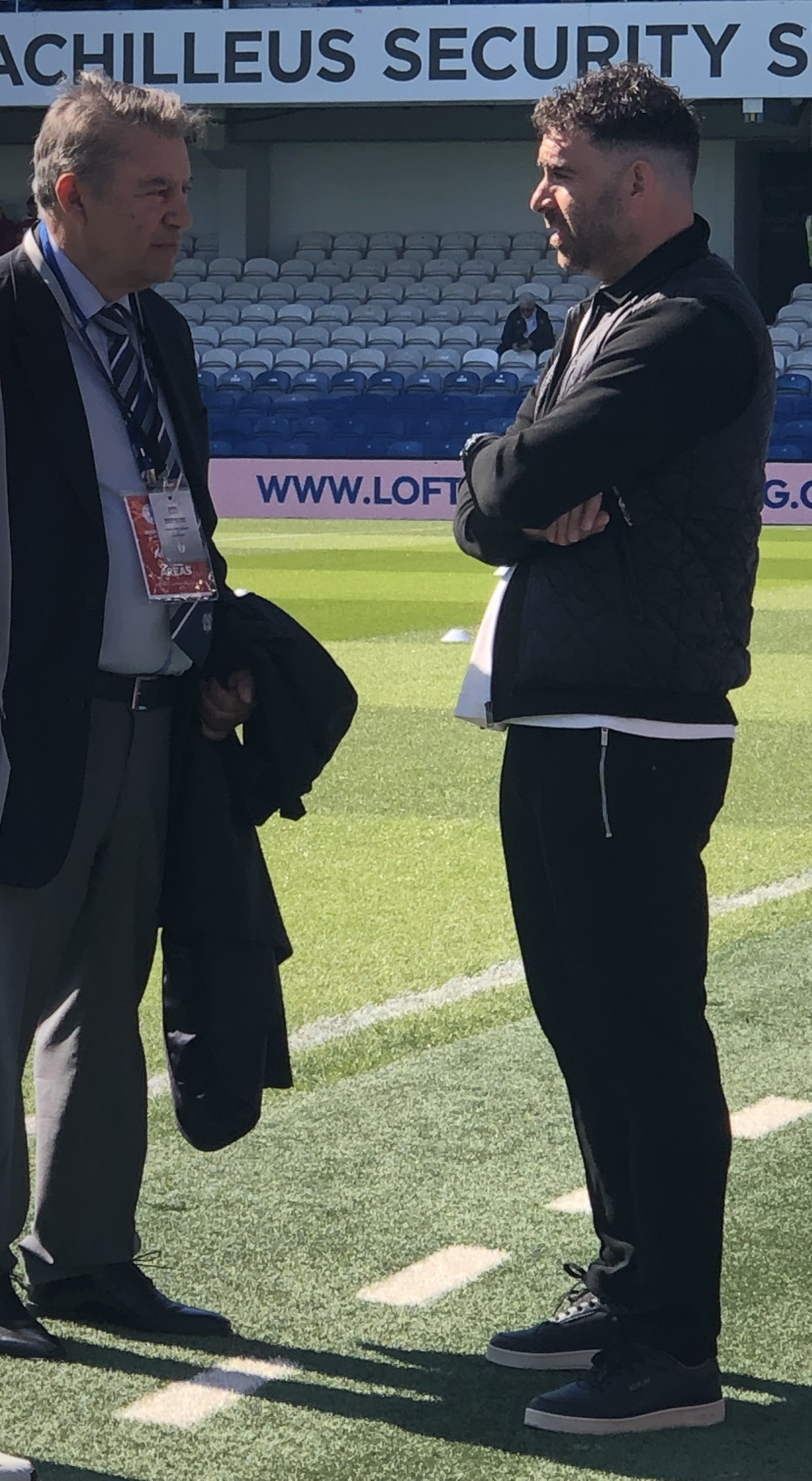
- Dalman (left) discussing with Omer Riza in 2025.
- Born: 7 April 1958 (age 67); Paphos, British Cyprus
- Title: Chairman of Cardiff City
- Term: 2014–

Mehmet Dalman (born 7 April 1958) is a Cypriot-British investment banker. He is the chairman of Welsh football club Cardiff City.

== Early life ==
Dalman was born in Paphos on 7 April 1958. As of Turkish Cypriot tradition, he was born as Mehmet Şükrü, taking his father's first name as his own last name. His brother, Cevdet, has retained the surname. He studied at the London School of Economics.

== Career ==
From 1990 to 1995, Dalman served as the Head of European and Japanese Equities at Credit Lyonnais Securities and Head of Quantitative Marketing at The Nikko Securities Europe. He served as a managing director at Deutsche Morgan Grenfell Capital Markets Limited, and Head of Japanese Equities and Equity Derivatives for Asia Pacific.

Between 1997 and 2004, Dalman was the first non-German to sit on the board of the German bank Commerzbank.

He founded the WMG Group / WMG Advisors LLP in 2004.

In January 2012, Dalman joined the Cardiff City board, as the Bluebirds looked to return to the top flight, and was subsequently made chairman in July 2013.

== Personal life ==
Dalman moved with his parents to London in 1968. He has a son and a daughter.
