= Maximiliano Amondarain =

Uruguayan footballer (born 1993)

Maxi Amondarain
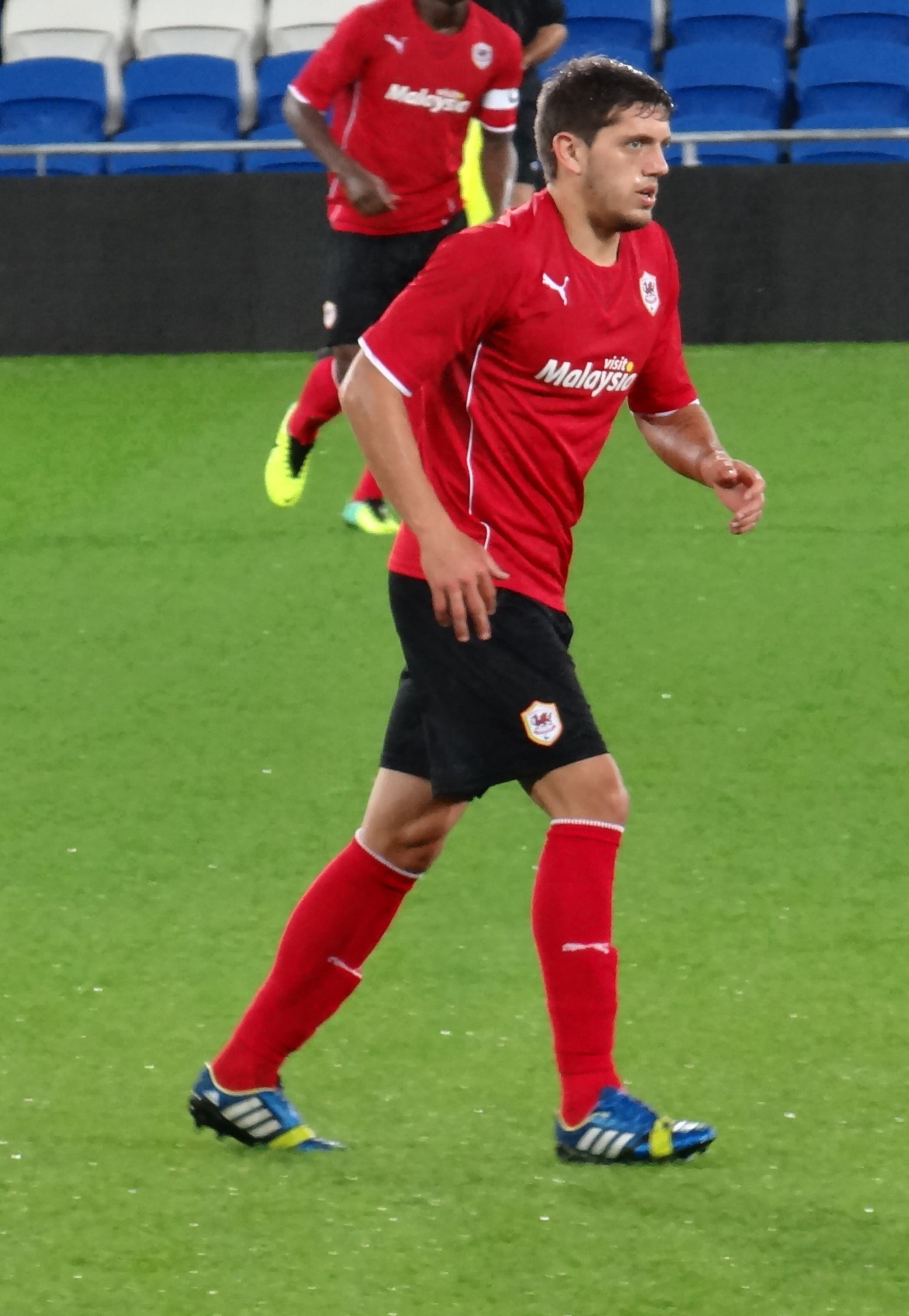
- Amondarain playing for Cardiff City in 2013

Personal information
- Full name: Maximiliano Javier Amondarain Colzada
- Date of birth: 22 January 1993 (age 33)
- Place of birth: Montevideo, Uruguay
- Height: 1.85 m (6 ft 1 in)
- Position: Centre back

Team information
- Current team: Cienciano
- Number: 4

Youth career
- 2006–2012: Nacional

Senior career*
Years	Team	Apps	(Gls)
2012–2013	Nacional	0	(0)
2012–2013	→ Progreso (loan)	18	(0)
2013–2015	Cardiff City	0	(0)
2015–2016	Elche B	22	(0)
2016–2017	Barakaldo	25	(3)
2017	Racing Montevideo	4	(0)
2018	Progreso	1	(0)
2019	Conquense	16	(1)
2019–2020	Orihuela	8	(0)
2020–2021	Rentistas	12	(0)
2022	Alianza Atlético	27	(0)
2023	Carlos A. Mannucci	24	(0)
2024	Sport Boys	26	(0)
2025-	Cienciano	26	(1)

International career
2013	Uruguay U20	1	(0)
- * Club domestic league appearances and goals as of 30 December 2025

Maximiliano Javier Amondarain Colzada (born 22 January 1993) is a Uruguayan footballer who plays as a centre back for Peruvian club Cienciano.

He began his career in his native Uruguay, playing for Nacional and Progreso. After a successful trial, he moved to Cardiff City but did not make an appearance for the first team during a two-year spell with the Bluebirds. He has also represented the Uruguay U20 national team.

== Club career ==
Amondarain was born in Montevideo. After graduating from Nacional's youth system, he was loaned to Progreso in 2012 summer. Progreso also kept an agreement with Nacional by receiving a part of the sale if the player was sold. Amondarain made his professional debut on 7 October 2012, in a 0–2 away defeat against Fénix. He finished the season with 18 appearances, and returned to Nacional.

On 30 August 2013, Cardiff City confirmed the signing of the free agent Amondarain after an impressive trial period earlier in the summer. He signed a four-year deal with the club after a one-month trial basis. Amondarain's contract with Cardiff was terminated by mutual agreement on 24 June 2015, having played no senior games for the club.

On 21 November he joined Elche CF's reserve team on a trial basis, signing a contract in December being registered in the first team in January.

Prior to the 2016–17 Jupiler League season, he spent time on trial with FC Emmen but was not offered a permanent contract.

Amondarain signed for Barakaldo in October 2016, moving to the same Basque region from where his grandparents had emigrated to South America at the time of the Spanish Civil War.

== Honours ==
Uruguay

- FIFA U-20 World Cup runner-up: 2013
