= Ben Nugent =

English footballer

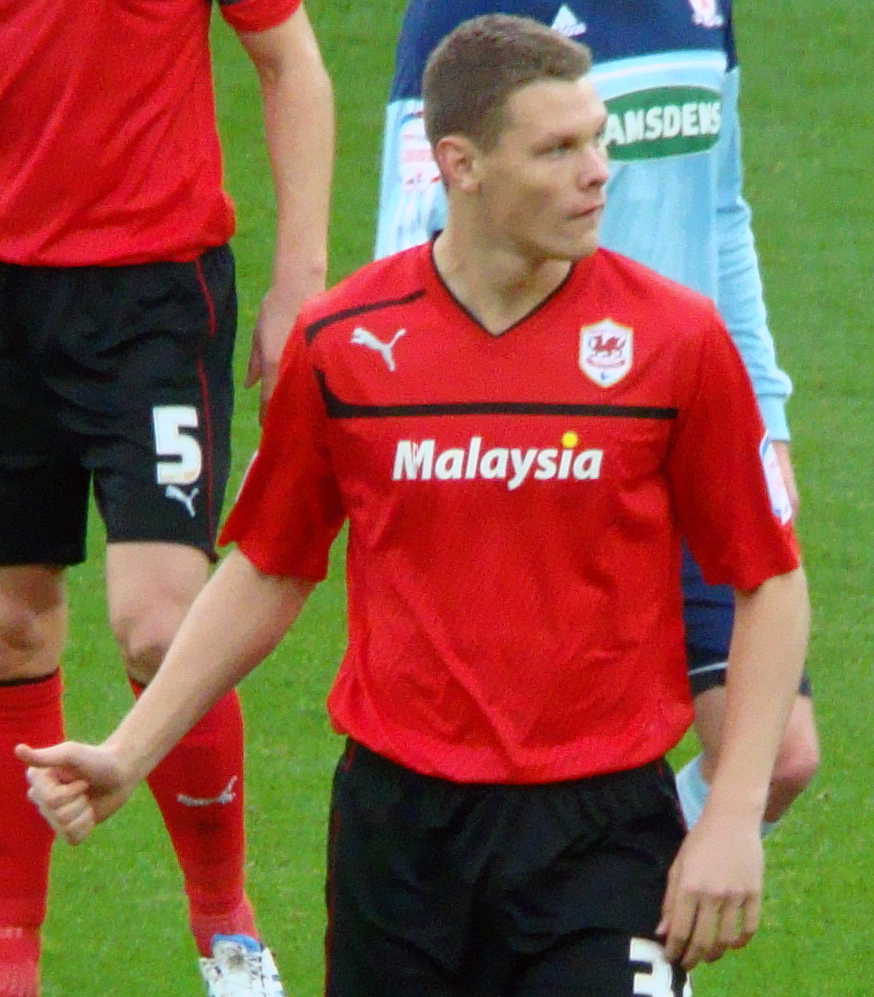
- Nugent playing for Cardiff City in 2012

Personal information
- Full name: Ben William Nugent
- Date of birth: 29 November 1992 (age 33)
- Place of birth: Welwyn Garden City, England
- Height: 1.96 m (6 ft 5 in)
- Position: Centre-back

Team information
- Current team: Gloucester City

Youth career
- 2007–2012: Cardiff City

Senior career*
Years	Team	Apps	(Gls)
2009–2010	Street	37	(3)
2012–2015	Cardiff City	12	(1)
2013–2014	→ Brentford (loan)	0	(0)
2014	→ Peterborough United (loan)	11	(0)
2014–2015	→ Yeovil Town (loan)	23	(1)
2015–2017	Crewe Alexandra	59	(1)
2017–2018	Gillingham	23	(0)
2018–2020	Stevenage	57	(1)
2020–2021	Barnet	23	(0)
2021–2023	Gloucester City	52	(0)
2023–2025	Angkor Tiger	44	(5)
2025	Bangkok	3	(0)
2026	Bedford Town	10	(1)
2026–	Gloucester City	0	(0)
- * Club domestic league appearances and goals as of 12:35, 29 May 2026 (UTC)

Ben William Nugent (born 29 November 1992) is an English professional footballer who plays as a centre-back who plays for Southern League Premier Division South club Gloucester City.

== Career ==
=== Cardiff City ===
Born in Welwyn Garden City, Hertfordshire, Nugent attended Millfield with his sports scholarships before he joined the academy at Championship side Cardiff City in 2007. However, Nugent was released in 2009 by manager Dave Jones. But his youth coach Neal Ardley convinced Jones to keep Nugent while he played for Western Premier side Street. Malky Mackay tipped Nugent to be a future captain at Cardiff City.

His professional debut for Cardiff came on 14 August 2012, in a 2–1 defeat to Northampton Town in the League Cup. His first league game came on 17 November, when he came on to replace Ben Turner against Middlesbrough and was awarded Man of the Match. On 24 November, Nugent made his first league start for the Bluebirds in a 2–1 win at Barnsley, and opened the scoring with his first senior goal. Nugent continued to captain the Development Squad, and on 4 January he signed a new deal until 2016. He then went on to start the next day against Macclesfield Town, which Cardiff lost 2–1, knocking them out of the FA Cup. Nugent continued to be a part of match-day squads throughout his debut season and was a substitute as Cardiff sealed promotion to the Premier League with a 0–0 draw at home against Charlton Athletic on 16 April 2013.

Nugent was named Cardiff City Young Player of Year 2012–13.

=== Loan spells ===
Nugent signed for League One side Brentford on 1 August 2013 on loan until 5 January 2014. He had played for Cardiff in a pre-season friendly at Griffin Park two days previously. He made his Brentford debut on 6 August, playing the full 90 minutes in a 3–2 victory over Dagenham & Redbridge in the League Cup. He scored his first goal for the club on 3 September, in a 5–3 victory over Wimbledon in the Football League Trophy, his third appearance. He scored again in the next round, against Peterborough United on 8 October. Nugent made an impact in a 5–0 FA Cup first-round win over Staines Town on 9 November 2013. Having made five appearances for the club, it was announced that Nugent would return to his parent club.

On 13 February 2014, Nugent joined League One side Peterborough United on loan. Nugent made his debut for the club on 14 February 2014, making his first start, in a 0–0 draw against Walsall. Nugent made eleven appearances for the club and returned to his parent club. He was however cup-tied for Peterborough's victory in the 2014 Football League Trophy Final.

On 11 July 2014, Nugent joined Yeovil Town on loan until 4 January 2015. Nugent made his debut for the club on 16 August 2014, making his first start, in a 2–0 loss against Gillingham. Nugent scored his first Yeovil Town goal on 26 December 2014, in a 2–1 loss against Bristol City. A week later, Nugent had his loan spell at Yeovil Town extended until the end of the season. Nugent was then sent off in the 26th minute after elbowing George Waring on 10 January 2015, in a 2–0 loss against Barnsley. After serving a four-match ban, Nugent made his first team return on 7 February 2015, making a start and playing 90 minutes, in a 2–1 win over Crawley Town. However, his first team opportunities was soon limited, due to a rule limiting numbers of loanees and was told to fight for the first-team place. Nugent went on to make twenty-three appearances and scored once for the club before returning to his parent club.

=== Crewe Alexandra ===
On 3 August 2015, Nugent joined League One side Crewe Alexandra on a free transfer, signing a two-year deal. Upon joining Crewe Alexandra, Nugent believed his move to the club could see his career "some much-needed stability". However, on 9 May 2017, Crewe announced that Nugent had been released by the club.

=== Gillingham ===
On 15 August 2017, Nugent signed for League One club Gillingham on a one-year contract.

=== Stevenage ===
Nugent was offered a new contract by Gillingham at the end of the 2017–18 season, but turned it down and signed for Stevenage of League Two. He remained with the club until the end of the 2019–20 season until he was released at the end of the season.

=== Barnet ===
Nugent signed for National League club Barnet on 8 September 2020.

=== Gloucester City ===
On 7 October 2021, Nugent transferred to National League North club Gloucester City.

=== Angkor Tiger ===
In July 2023, Nugent signed for Cambodian Premier League side Angkor Tiger. He scored his first goal for the club on 16 September in a 5–2 defeat by Preah Khan Reach Svay Rieng FC.

=== Bangkok ===
On 2 July 2025, Nugent joined Thai League 2 club Bangkok.

On 16 December 2025, the club announced that Nugent had been released by the club, bringing his time with the Thai side to an end.

=== Return to England ===
In March 2026, Nugent returned to England, joining National League North club Bedford Town. Two months later, he returned to Gloucester City, now in the Southern League Premier Division South.

== Personal life ==
Nugent finished in the top three in the 1500 metres national championship, but decided to focus on football instead. Nugent's father Richard was also a footballer and also played for Stevenage and Barnet.

== Career statistics ==
As of match played 3 May 2023

Appearances and goals by club, season and competition
Club	Season	League			National Cup		League Cup		Other		Total	
Club	Season	Division	Apps	Goals	Apps	Goals	Apps	Goals	Apps	Goals	Apps	Goals
Street	2009–10	Western League Premier Division	37	3	0	0	—		1 (Note: Appearance in Western League Cup)	0	38	3
Cardiff City	2012–13	Championship	12	1	1	0	1	0	—		14	1
Cardiff City	2013–14	Premier League	0	0	—		—		—		0	0
Cardiff City	2014–15	Championship	0	0	—		—		—		0	0
Cardiff City	Total		12	1	1	0	1	0	—		14	1
Brentford (loan)	2013–14	League One	0	0	1	0	2	0	2 (Note: Appearance(s) in EFL Trophy)	2	5	2
Peterborough United (loan)	2013–14	League One	11	0	—		—		—		11	0
Yeovil Town (loan)	2014–15	League One	23	1	4	0	1	0	1	0	29	1
Crewe Alexandra	2015–16	League One	39	1	1	0	1	0	1	0	42	1
Crewe Alexandra	2016–17	League Two	20	0	1	0	1	0	2	0	24	0
Crewe Alexandra	Total		59	1	2	0	2	0	3	0	66	1
Gillingham	2017–18	League One	23	0	1	0	—		3	0	27	0
Stevenage	2018–19	League Two	34	1	0	0	1	0	1	0	36	0
Stevenage	2019–20	League Two	23	0	2	0	0	0	3	0	28	0
Stevenage	Total		57	1	2	0	1	0	4	0	64	1
Barnet	2020–21	National League	21	0	2	0	—		1 (Note: Appearance(s) in FA Trophy)	0	24	0
Barnet	2021–22	National League	2	0	—		—		—		2	0
Barnet	Total		23	0	2	0	—		1	0	26	0
Gloucester City	2021–22	National League North	21	0	0	0	—		2	0	23	0
Gloucester City	2022–23	National League North	31	0	0	0	—		3 (Note: Appearance(s) in National League North Play-Offs)	0	34	0
Gloucester City	Total		52	0	0	0	—		5	0	57	0
Angkor Tiger	2023–24	Cambodian Premier League	0	0	0	0	—		0	0	0	0
Career total			297	7	13	0	7	0	19	2	336	9

== Honours ==
Cardiff City

- Football League Championship: 2012–13

Individual

- Cardiff City Young Player of the Year: 2012–13
