= Mark Hudson (footballer, born 1982) =

English footballer (born 1982)

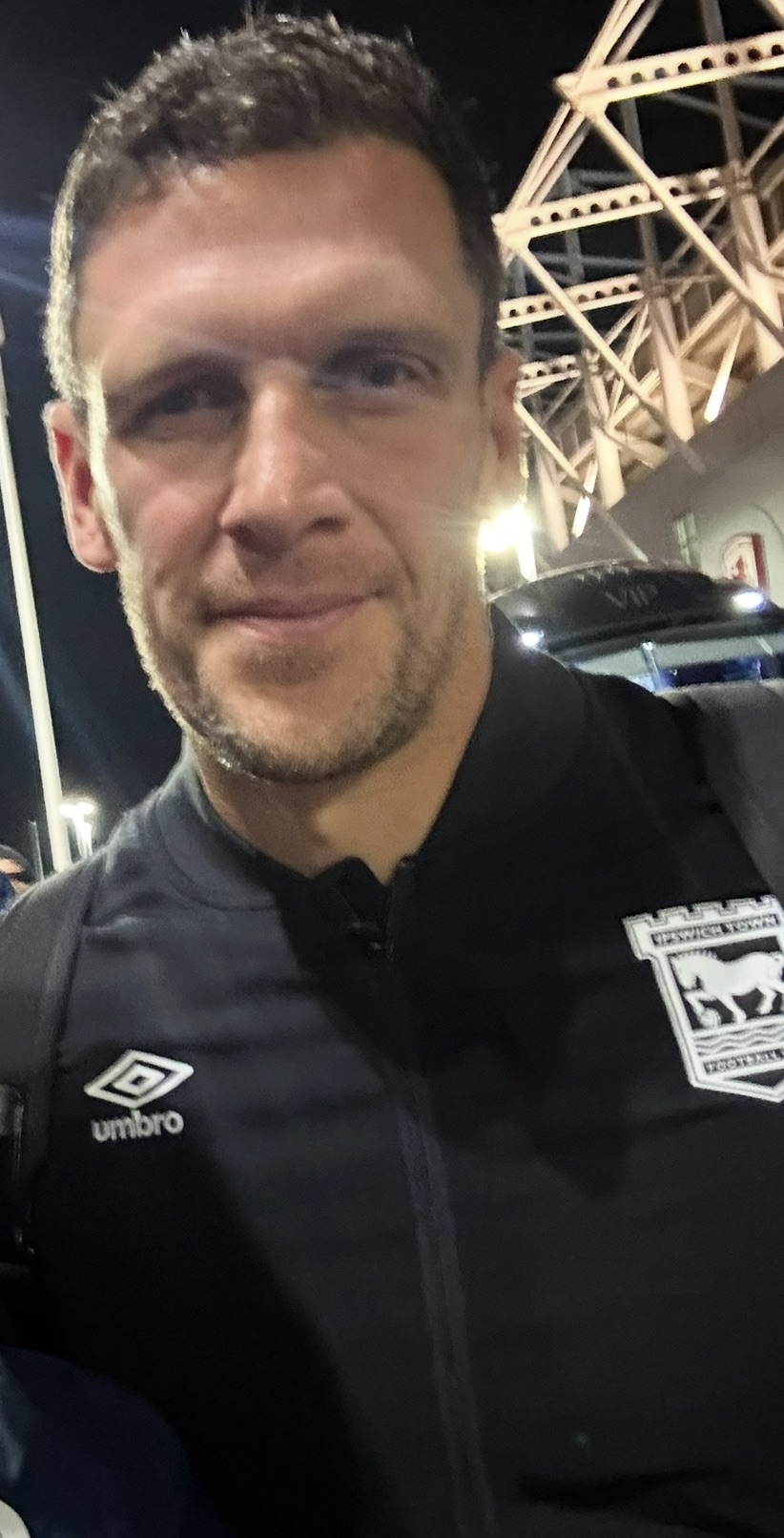
- Hudson with Ipswich Town in 2025

Personal information
- Full name: Mark Alexander Hudson
- Date of birth: 30 March 1982 (age 44)
- Place of birth: Guildford, England
- Height: 6 ft 3 in (1.91 m)
- Position: Defender

Team information
- Current team: Ipswich Town (first team coach)

Youth career
- –1999: Fulham

Senior career*
Years	Team	Apps	(Gls)
1999–2004	Fulham	0	(0)
2003	→ Oldham Athletic (loan)	11	(0)
2003	→ Oldham Athletic (loan)	4	(0)
2004	→ Crystal Palace (loan)	14	(0)
2004–2008	Crystal Palace	106	(7)
2008–2009	Charlton Athletic	43	(3)
2009–2014	Cardiff City	144	(11)
2014–2017	Huddersfield Town	102	(5)
Total		424	(26)

Managerial career
- 2018–2019: Huddersfield Town U23s
- 2019: Huddersfield Town (caretaker)
- 2019: Huddersfield Town (caretaker)
- 2022–2023: Cardiff City
- * Club domestic league appearances and goals

Mark Alexander Hudson (born 30 March 1982) is an English football manager and former professional footballer who is first team coach at Ipswich Town. A centre-back, he began his professional career with Fulham after progressing through the club's youth academy. He made his senior debut in a League Cup match in 2000 but made just two further first team appearances for Fulham. He spent two spells on loan with Oldham Athletic in 2003 before joining Crystal Palace on loan after Oldham manager Iain Dowie moved between the two clubs. He joined Palace on a permanent basis soon after as they spent one season in the Premier League before establishing himself in the first team following their return to the Championship.

In 2008, he joined Charlton Athletic following the expiration of his contract where he was later appointed captain of the side but suffered relegation to League One during his only season at the club. He instead joined Cardiff City and was appointed captain on his arrival. He helped the side reach the play-offs in his first three seasons, suffering defeat each time, before they won promotion to the Premier League by winning the Championship in 2013. However, Hudson was dropped following promotion in favour of new signings and made only nine further appearances in over a year before departing for Huddersfield Town.

He again took over the captaincy soon after his arrival and made over 100 appearances for the club during a three-year spell, helping them win promotion to the Premier League in his final season. He announced his retirement from playing at the end of the 2016–17 season and was appointed manager of the club's under-23 squad before becoming Huddersfield's caretaker manager on two occasions, in addition to working as a first-team coach.

Hudson was most recently manager of Cardiff City in what was first permanent managerial position having been promoted from first-team coach following an impressive interim period.

== Playing career ==
=== Fulham ===
Born in Guildford, Hudson played for Farncombe Youth as a child. As a teenager, he briefly played for Swindon Town before joining Fulham when he was 14, which he later reflected on, stating, "I was at Swindon when I was about 13; I played a game against Fulham and they asked me to come down for some training. I came to the club at about 14 but took a year out because I wasn't really enjoying it. When I came back I wasn't offered a YTS because I didn't progress quick enough. I took the knock-back and stayed at college because it's always useful to have an academic side to fall back on. I was then told that I was going to be given a professional contract and it's gone from there."

After progressing through the ranks at the Fulham Academy, Hudson was involved in the Fulham first team and made his senior debut, being named in the starting line-up for a 1–0 defeat against Chesterfield in the first leg of a League Cup tie on 19 September 2000. Hudson also made another League Cup appearance for Fulham in the return leg on 27 September 2000, in a 4–0 win. In December 2001, Hudson spent two days on trial with Grimsby Town in preparation for a possible loan move, however, the transfer was not completed. At the end of the 2001–02 season, Hudson signed a one-year contract with Fulham. He did not make another senior appearance for the side until 6 November 2002, when he played in a 3–1 win over Bury in the League Cup. In total, Hudson made three appearances for Fulham, all in the League Cup.

Ahead of the 2003–04 season, Hudson was promoted to the first team by manager Chris Coleman, but was later loaned out to Second Division side Oldham Athletic in August 2003 on an initial one-month loan deal. He made his debut for Oldham in a 2–1 loss against Brentford on 25 August 2003. His loan spell with Oldham was later extended for another month. After his initial loan spell ended in late–October, Hudson re–joined them on loan the following month. He went on to make four more appearances for the side before returning to his parent club in December.

=== Crystal Palace ===
In January 2004, Hudson was loaned out again, joining Crystal Palace on a three-month loan deal where he was reunited with former Oldham manager Iain Dowie, who had moved to Selhurst Park one month before. He was signed by the club as a replacement for the injured Curtis Fleming who had suffered a broken bone in his leg. He made his debut for Palace in a 5–1 win over Watford on 17 January 2004. He quickly established himself in the first team and impressed manager Dowie once again. As a result, his loan spell with the club was extended for a further two months.

Hudson started in six consecutive matches following his debut until he was sent–off in a 1–0 win over Gillingham for committing a professional foul in the penalty area, although Nicky Southall was unable to convert the resulting penalty. After serving a one match suspension, he returned to his parent club following his last appearance in a 1–1 draw against Wigan Athletic on 17 April 2004. He made 14 appearances for the side during his loan spell as Palace went on to defeat West Ham United in the play-off final to win promotion to the Premiership. After his loan spell at Palace came to an end, local newspaper News Shopper compared Hudson to former loan signing Ashley Cole, writing that, like Cole, he would be seen "as a big star of the future who came of age at Palace."

Following their promotion, Dowie returned to sign Hudson on a permanent basis for the start of the 2004–05 season. His first game after his signing came in the opening game of the season, a 1–1 draw against Norwich City. In their following match, a 3–1 loss against Everton, Hudson scored his first goal for the club when he converted a Wayne Routledge cross in the opening ten minutes of the match. However, he suffered ankle injury soon after and, after featuring for the reserve side, he was further sidelined by a hernia problem. His next appearance came seven months later on 2 April 2005 in a 1–0 loss against Middlesbrough. Hudson went on to finish his first season with eight appearances and one goal in all competitions as Palace were relegated from the Premier League on the final day of the season.

Hudson made his first appearance of the 2005–06 season in a 2–1 loss against Luton Town in the opening game of the season. He played a vital role for the side when he set up two goals, in a 2–1 win over Liverpool in the third round of the League Cup on 25 October 2005. However, Hudson remained out of the first team, as he was demoted to either the substitute bench or reserve side due to competition over the centre–back position between himself, Fitz Hall, Darren Ward, Emmerson Boyce and Tony Popovic. Hudson finished the season having made 19 appearances in all competitions as he struggled to establish himself in the first team during his first two seasons at Selhurst Park.

Ahead of the 2006–07 season, Dowie left the club and was replaced by Peter Taylor. Under Taylor, Hudson became a first team regular and he set up the winning goal for James Scowcroft, in a 2–1 win over Ipswich Town in the opening game of the season. In their following match, he scored his first goal of the season, in a 3–1 win over Southend United. He scored two goals in four matches over the Christmas period, in a 1–0 win over Sunderland on 22 December 2006 and a 3–1 win over Norwich City on 1 January 2007. Hudson went on to make 42 appearances and scored 4 times in the 2006–07 season, forming a defensive partnership alongside Leon Cort.

In the 2007–08 season, Hudson kept his first team place in the central defence, alongside either Cort or José Fonte. He captained the side for the first time on 20 August 2007 during a 2–2 draw with Leicester City. In a match against Sheffield United on 22 September 2007, he scored an own goal following a left-wing cross from Keith Gillespie, which Crystal Palace went on to win 3–2. Hudson was able to make amends when he scored an opener against Burnley seven days later on 29 September 2007, in a 1–1 draw. His performances continued to impress manager Taylor and he was offered a new contract, just before Taylor's sacking. Under new manager Neil Warnock, Hudson scored his second goal of the season in a 2–0 win over Bristol City to start a 15 match unbeaten run that lasted until 28 January 2008. He was later appointed captain midway through the season as the Eagles made the play-offs before being beaten by Bristol City. Over the course of the season, Hudson made 49 appearances, missing one match during the season, and scored twice in all competitions.

With his contract expected to end at the 2007–08 season, doubts over his future at the club began to materialise. Hudson, stated that he wanted to stay at the club however, contract negotiations broke down and he rejected the club's last contract offer.

=== Charlton Athletic ===
When his contract expired at the end of the season, Hudson chose to move on a free transfer to local rivals and fellow Championship side Charlton Athletic, signing a three-year contract. Upon joining Charlton, Warnock stated his belief that Hudson had made a mistake by deciding to leave Palace.

Hudson scored on his debut in the opening game of the season, a 2–0 win over Swansea City. He started in every match from the start of the season until he was suspended following a sending off for a second bookable offence during a 2–0 loss against Cardiff City on 18 October 2008, serving a one match suspension. After suffering a knock during a 1–0 win against his former club, Crystal Palace on 27 January 2009, Hudson returned to the first team from injury, in a 2–0 win over Plymouth Argyle on 14 February 2009.

Hudson's experience as captain at Palace earned him the same role at Charlton and he went on to make 45 appearances in all competitions for the club as they suffered relegation to League One, finishing bottom of the division. Hudson was named runner–up for the 2008–09 Charlton's Player of the Year behind Nicky Bailey. He later described the relegation as "the lowest point of his career".

=== Cardiff City ===
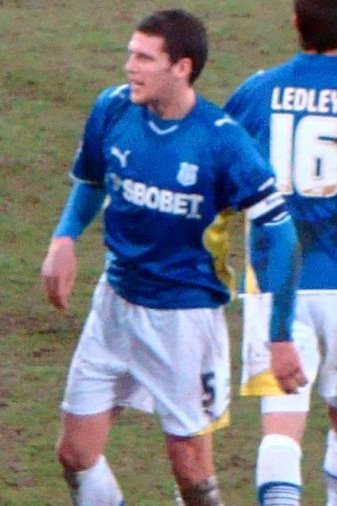
Hudson playing for Cardiff City in 2009

On 2 July 2009, Hudson signed for Championship side Cardiff City for a fee of £1.075m with an extra £250,000 possible if the Bluebirds reached the Premier League. An ongoing contract dispute with midfielder Joe Ledley led manager Dave Jones to hand the captaincy to Hudson at the start of the season, Cardiff becoming the third successive club at which he had been appointed captain.

Hudson made his Cardiff debut in a 4–0 win over Scunthorpe United in the opening game of the season. He quickly established himself in the starting eleven, in the centre–back position, alongside Anthony Gerrard and Gábor Gyepes. Hudson scored an own goal in a 1–1 draw against his former club Crystal Palace on 17 October 2009 before scoring his first goal for the club three weeks later during a 3–2 defeat to local rivals Swansea City. He made his two-hundredth career league appearance on Boxing Day against Plymouth Argyle and added his second goal of the season on 9 January 2010 against Blackpool. However, his season was dealt a blow when he was ruled out for up to two months after being forced to undergo surgery on a split ankle tendon at the end of January. After three months on the sidelines, he made his return for the first team, coming on as a second-half replacement for Darcy Blake, in a 3–2 win over Sheffield Wednesday on 24 April 2010. Hudson featured in the play-offs where Cardiff lost 3–2 to Blackpool in the final. He finished his first season, making 33 appearances and scoring 2 times in all competitions.

At the start of the 2010–11 season, loan signing Craig Bellamy was appointed team captain, with Hudson maintaining the role of club captain. He was ever-present from the start of the 2010–11 season until 19 March 2011, when he suffered a knee injury in a 3–3 draw with Millwall which ruled him out for up to six weeks. Despite reports claiming Hudson would be out for the season, he returned in Cardiff's 1–0 victory over Preston North End on 25 April. He started the final game of the season against Burnley but was taken off with another injury after 30 minutes. Again reports of Hudson's season being in doubt were proven wrong as he was cleared for the first leg of Cardiff's second consecutive play-off participation. Cardiff drew the first match against Reading 0–0 at the Madjeski Stadium, before losing 3–0 in the return leg.

Under new manager Malky Mackay, Hudson regained the captaincy for the 2011–12 season following the end of Bellamy's loan deal and led the team to a 1–0 win over West Ham United in the opening match. His first goal of the season came in a Severnside derby on 14 August 2011 against Bristol City. Hudson made his 250th league appearance on 27 August against Portsmouth. A small hamstring injury meant he missed two matches, but he returned on 4 December coming on for Gerrard against Birmingham City. His 100th appearance for Cardiff came on 2 January 2012 against Reading, whilst also making his three-hundredth club appearance. On 13 January 2012, Hudson signed a two-year contract extension, keeping him in the Welsh capital until 2014. He suffered an ankle injury in January 2012, but returned to captain the side in its first ever League Cup final against Liverpool, in which the Bluebirds were beaten 3–2 on penalties. On 17 April 2012, he scored his fifth goal of the season from 68 yards out against Derby County, a goal which was later voted the club's Goal of the Season. After helping the side qualify for the play–offs, Hudson played both legs against West Ham United, which saw Cardiff City lose 5–0 on aggregate, ending their season and their hopes of reaching to the Premier League. As a result, Hudson was rated one of the most consistent Bluebirds players in the 2011–12 season.

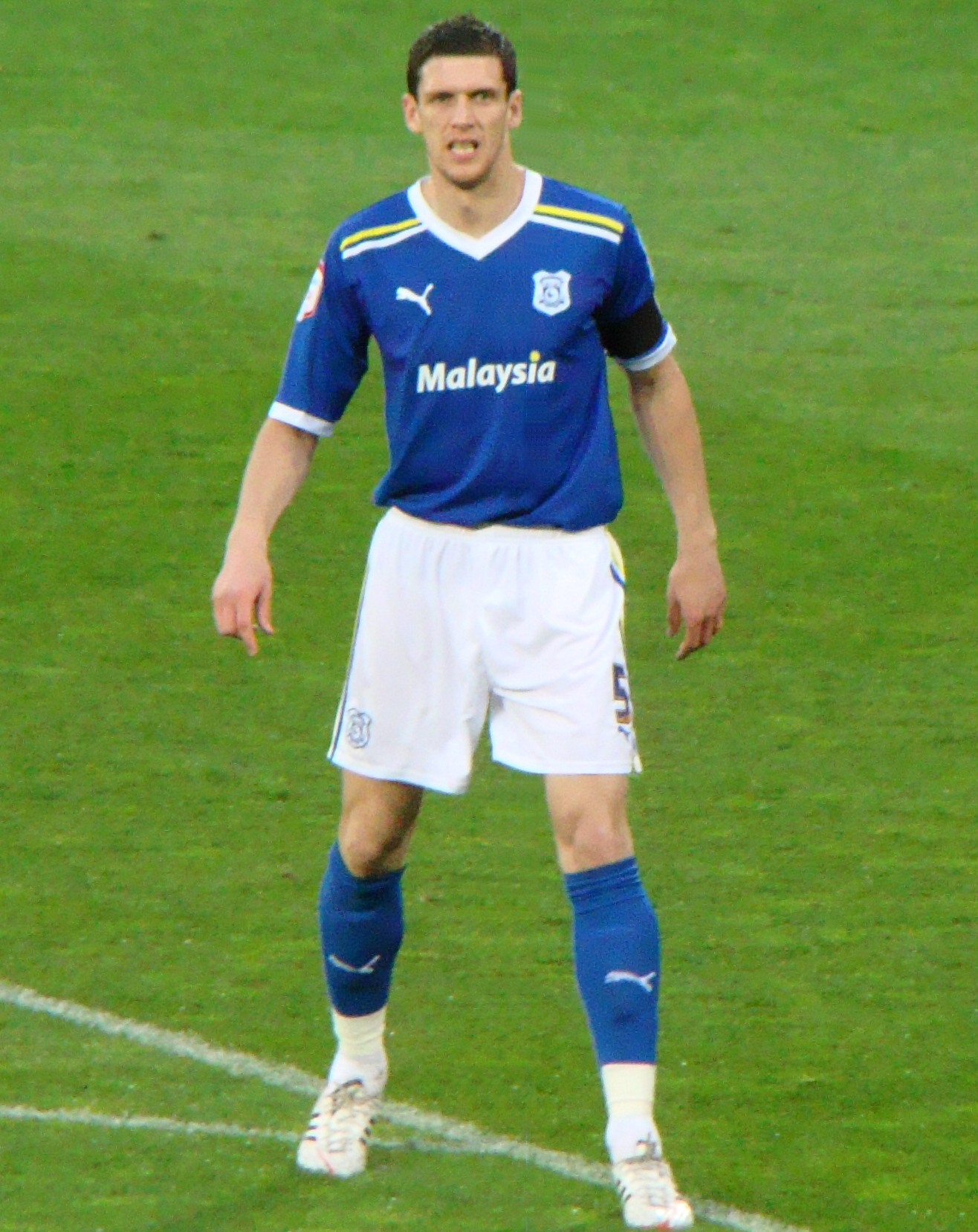
Hudson playing for Cardiff City in 2012.

At the start of the 2012–13 season, Hudson remained as the captain, even after the return signing of Bellamy. Hudson got the Football League's first goal of the 2012–13 season, scoring a late winner against Huddersfield Town on 17 August 2012. After the departure of Gerrard, he formed a central defensive partnership with either Ben Turner or Matthew Connolly. Hudson soon came under criticism from Nathan Blake for his performance during a 5–4 defeat to Charlton Athletic on 6 November 2012. However, he was able to redeem himself when he scored against Hull City and was named Man of the Match, being praised by his teammate Turner, who described him as the "player of the season". Despite serving a one match suspension after picking up a fifth booking of the season during a match against Blackburn Rovers, Hudson was nominated for December's Championship Player of the Month but lost out to Peterborough United's Dwight Gayle. Hudson made his three-hundredth career league start at Blackpool in a 2–1 victory on 19 January. In March, Hudson was forced to undergo ankle surgery and was ruled out for the rest of the season. Despite Mackay's hopes of Hudson returning from injury again, it never happened. Hudson lifted the Championship trophy following the 1–1 home draw with Bolton Wanderers at Cardiff City Stadium in May. At the end of the 2012–13 season, Hudson was named PFA Team of the Year, along with Peter Whittingham, as well as winning Cardiff City's Player of the Year. He described winning the league was the 'best moment of his career'.

Ahead of the 2013–14 season, Hudson extended his deal by a further year until the summer of 2015 and retained his captaincy for the side. Despite expecting to lead the side in the Premier League, Hudson, however, spent the start of the season on the substitute bench, due to Mackay's preference of Steven Caulker and Turner in the centre–back position. He made his first appearance of the 2013–14 season in a 2–0 win over Accrington Stanley in the first round of League Cup. Under Ole Gunnar Solskjær, Mackay's successor, he played his first Premier League match since 2005 in a 2–0 loss against West Ham United on 11 January 2014. He made a second Premier League appearance in a 2–0 loss against Manchester United on 28 January 2014, but suffered a hamstring injury and was ruled out for the rest of the season.

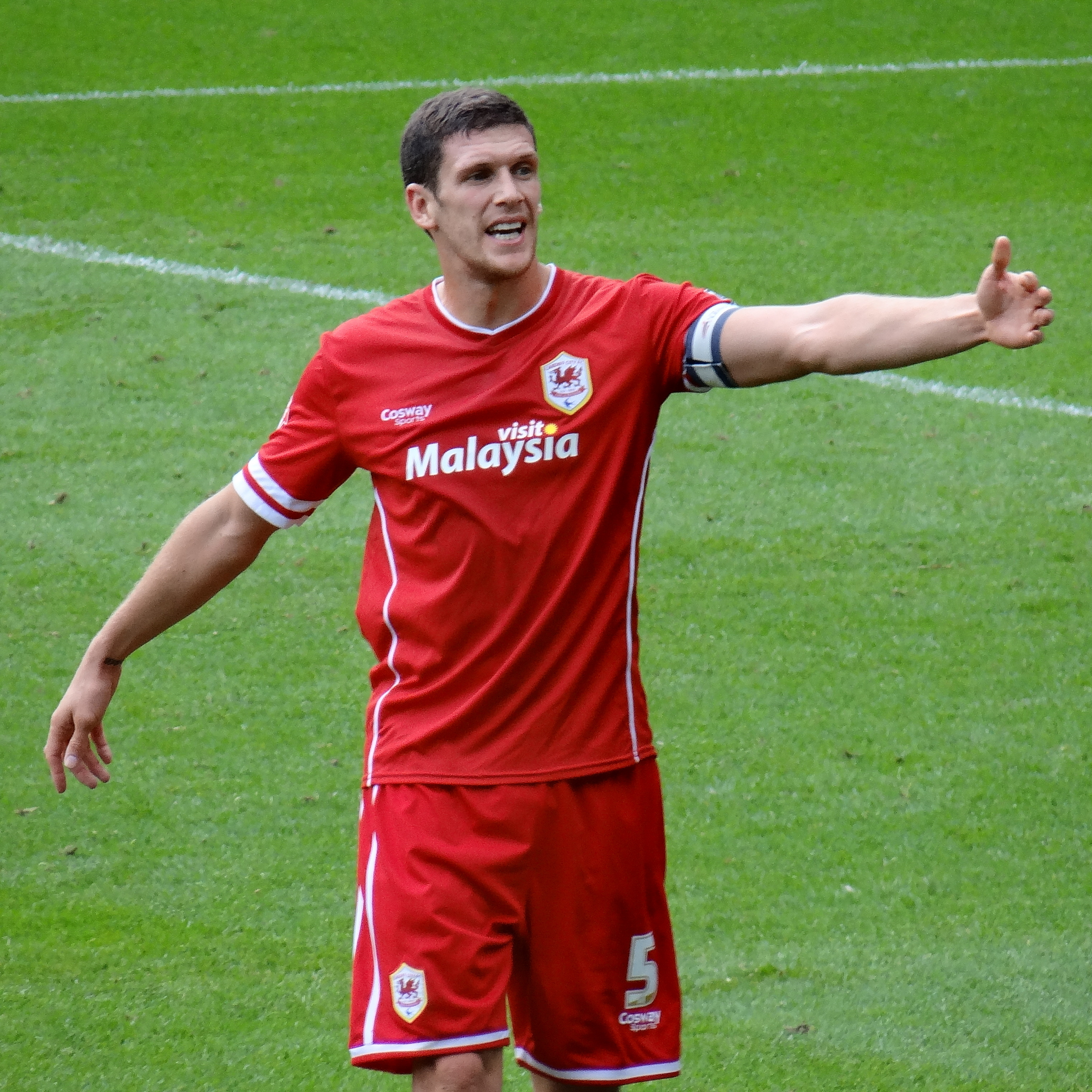
Hudson playing for Cardiff City in 2014.

Ahead of the 2014–15 season, Hudson's future at Cardiff was in doubt following their relegation from the Premier League. He managed to recover from a hamstring injury, in time for the opening game of the season against Blackburn Rovers, in which he set up Cardiff's goal in a 1–1 draw. After making three appearances for the side, the club announced his departure to Huddersfield Town on the last day of the transfer window. His departure came after new signing, Bruno Ecuele Manga arrived from FC Lorient. Later, Hudson was critical towards Solskjær over the way he handled his departure. By the time he departed the club, Hudson was considered a cult hero with fans.

=== Huddersfield Town ===
As the August 2014 transfer window shut, Hudson moved from Cardiff to fellow Championship side Huddersfield Town for an undisclosed fee on a two-year deal.

He made his début in a 2–1 defeat to Middlesbrough on 13 September 2014. Hudson was given the captaincy for the first time for the side against Blackburn Rovers on 4 October 2014. Afterwards, on 16 October 2014, he took over from Lee Peltier as the captain of the Terriers and scored his first goal for the club in a 3–2 defeat to Derby County on 4 November 2014. After joining the club, he formed a central–defensive partnership with Murray Wallace, Joel Lynch and Anthony Gerrard despite strong competition. Hudson made his 400th career appearance against Fulham on 20 March 2015, in a 2–0 loss. Hudson finished his first season at the club, making 37 appearances and scoring twice in all competitions. At the end of the season, he was given the Media Player of the Year award.

In the 2015–16 season, Hudson maintained his captaincy role and his place as a centre–back. He was linked with a move away from the club, but stayed throughout the summer transfer window. Amid the transfer speculation, he started the first five matches of the season before suffering an ankle injury during a 1–0 loss against Queens Park Rangers on 29 August 2015. He made his return from injury on 17 October 2015, in a 0–0 draw against Ipswich Town, maintaining his first team place for the rest of the season following the appointment of Powell's successor, David Wagner. He scored his first goal of the season, in a 5–0 win over Charlton Athletic on 12 January 2016, followed by scoring his second four days later, on 16 January 2016, in a 1–1 draw against Fulham. After serving a two match ban for accumulating 10 yellow cards during the season, Hudson returned from suspension during a 2–0 win over Nottingham Forest on 13 February 2016. As a result of his performance during the season, he began talks over a new contract with the club. He later described the Huddersfield squad for the 2015–16 season as the "best footballing side I've been involved in." After a month of negotiating, Hudson signed a three–year contract, keeping him at the club until 2019. In his second season with Huddersfield, Hudson made 41 appearances, scoring three times in all competitions.

In the 2016–17 season, Hudson formed a central–defensive partnership with new signing Christopher Schindler at the start of the season. This continued until his suspension in late-September, as well as, facing a tactics change. In late–December, however, Hudson suffered a hamstring injury that kept him out for the whole year. Hudson was part of the squad that saw Huddersfield side promoted to the Premier League after beating Reading 5–4 in penalty shoot–out after a 0–0 in the EFL Championship play-off final.

On 8 August 2017, he announced his retirement from playing to take up a coaching role with the club as part of David Wagner's staff.

== Coaching career ==
Hudson was appointed manager of Huddersfield's under-23 team in January 2018. Hudson had previously hinted about moving into coaching once he retired and has completed his UEFA A licence. On 14 January 2019, he was appointed as interim manager at Huddersfield Town following the departure of David Wagner. He managed the side for one game, a 3–0 defeat against Manchester City, before Jan Siewert was appointed as the new permanent manager. Following the sacking of Siewart on 16 August 2019, Hudson once again took over as caretaker manager before Danny Cowley was appointed. Hudson was retained as a first-team coach.

On 12 November 2021, Hudson re-joined his former club Cardiff City, taking the role of first team coach. On 18 September 2022, following the sacking of Steve Morison, Hudson was appointed interim manager of Cardiff City. On 14 November 2022, Hudson was appointed as the permanent manager of Cardiff until the end of the 2022–23 season following an impressive interim spell. He was relieved of his managerial duties on 14 January 2023.

On 4 July 2023, Hudson joined Sheffield United as first-team defensive coach.

== Personal life ==
Hudson is married to Marie-Louise Hudson and together, the couple have two sons and a daughter. While at Cardiff City, Hudson supported for the 'Kick Racism out of Football' campaign in the wake of Michael Chopra's race row.

Hudson also took up yoga as another way to regain his fitness. By the time he departed Cardiff City, media outlet Wales Online described Hudson as "resolutely old-fashioned, a family man." During his playing at Huddersfield Town, local newspaper Huddersfield Daily Examiner described Hudson as having "a sense of leadership and responsibility, the ability to spark respect and admiration in others, and a desire to help and improve younger members of the side."

== Career statistics ==
=== As a player ===
Appearances and goals by club, season and competition
Club	Season	League			National cup		League cup		Other		Total	
Club	Season	Division	Apps	Goals	Apps	Goals	Apps	Goals	Apps	Goals	Apps	Goals
Fulham	2000–01	First Division	0	0	0	0	2	0	–	–	2	0
Fulham	2001–02	Premier League	0	0	0	0	0	0	–	–	0	0
Fulham	2002–03	Premier League	0	0	0	0	1	0	–	–	1	0
Fulham	Total		0	0	0	0	3	0	–	–	3	0
Oldham Athletic (loan)	2003–04	Second Division	11	0	0	0	0	0	1 (Note: Appearances in Football League Trophy)	0	12	0
Oldham Athletic (loan)	2003–04	Second Division	4	0	0	0	0	0	0	0	4	0
Oldham Athletic (loan)	Total		15	0	0	0	0	0	1	0	16	0
Crystal Palace (loan)	2003–04	First Division	14	0	0	0	0	0	–	–	14	0
Crystal Palace	2004–05	Premier League	7	1	0	0	2	0	–	–	9	1
Crystal Palace	2005–06	Championship	15	0	3	0	4	0	–	–	22	0
Crystal Palace	2006–07	Championship	39	4	2	0	1	0	–	–	42	4
Crystal Palace	2007–08	Championship	45	2	1	0	1	0	2 (Note: Appearances in Football League play-offs)	0	49	2
Crystal Palace	Total		106	7	6	0	8	0	2	0	122	7
Charlton Athletic	2008–09	Championship	43	3	2	0	0	0	–	–	45	3
Cardiff City	2009–10	Championship	27	2	2	0	1	0	3	0	33	2
Cardiff City	2010–11	Championship	40	0	2	0	1	0	2	0	45	0
Cardiff City	2011–12	Championship	39	5	0	0	3	0	2	0	44	5
Cardiff City	2012–13	Championship	33	4	0	0	0	0	–	–	33	4
Cardiff City	2013–14	Premier League	2	0	2	0	2	0	–	–	6	0
Cardiff City	2014–15	Championship	3	0	0	0	0	0	–	–	3	0
Cardiff City	Total		144	11	6	0	7	0	7	0	164	11
Huddersfield Town	2014–15	Championship	41	2	1	0	0	0	–	–	42	2
Huddersfield Town	2015–16	Championship	39	3	2	0	0	0	–	–	41	3
Huddersfield Town	2016–17	Championship	22	0	4	0	0	0	–	–	26	0
Huddersfield Town	Total		102	5	7	0	0	0	–	–	109	5
Career total			424	26	21	0	18	0	10	0	477	26

== Managerial statistics ==
As of match played 15 January 2023

Managerial record by team and tenure
Team	Nat	From	To	Record								Ref
Team	Nat	From	To	G	W	D	L	GF	GA	GD	Win %	Ref
Huddersfield Town (caretaker)	(England)	14 January 2019	21 January 2019	1	0	0	1	0	3	−3	0.00	
Huddersfield Town (caretaker)	(England)	17 August 2019	9 September 2019	3	0	0	3	2	6	−4	0.00	
Cardiff City	(Wales)	18 September 2022	14 January 2023	18	4	7	7	16	20	−4	22.22	
Total				22	4	7	11	18	29	−11	18.18	—

== Honours ==
Cardiff City

- Football League Championship: 2012–13
- Football League Cup runner-up: 2011–12

Huddersfield Town

- EFL Championship play-offs: 2017

Individual

- PFA Team of the Year: 2012–13 Championship
- Cardiff City Player of the Year: 2012–13
- Cardiff City Goal of the Season: 2011–12
