= 2012–13 Cardiff City F.C. season =

Welsh football club season

Cardiff City F.C.
2012–13 season
- Chairman: Simon Lim
- Manager: Malky Mackay
- Stadium: Cardiff City Stadium
- Championship: 1st (champions)
- FA Cup: Third round (eliminated by Macclesfield Town)
- League Cup: First round (eliminated by Northampton Town)
- Top goalscorer: League: Aron Gunnarsson; Peter Whittingham (8 each); All: Heiðar Helguson (9 goals)
- Highest home attendance: 26,588 vs. Nottingham Forest (13 April 2013, Championship)
- Lowest home attendance: 20,058 vs. Hull City (10 Nov 2012, Championship)
- Average home league attendance: 22,296
Home colours	Away colours	Third colours

The 2012–13 season was Cardiff's 86th in the Football League after joining in 1920. Cardiff were in their ninth consecutive season in the second tier following a third consecutive failure in the play-offs. Cardiff went under a "re-branding" during the close season meaning the home colours would be changed to red from the traditional blue, ending 104 years of the tradition. Cardiff were promoted to the Premier League during the season.

== Events ==
This is a list of the significant events to occur at the club during the 2012–13 season, presented in chronological order. This list does not include completed transfers, which are listed in the transfers section below, or match results, which are in the results section.

June

- 1 June – The Football League decides to switch back to seven subs for the season, increasing it from five subs used last season.
- 4 June – Malky Mackay turns down offer from Norwich City to become manager. Former Cardiff player Kevin Cooper is appointed as Under-21 coach.
- 6 June – Cardiff change their home colours from the traditional Blue, White and Yellow to Red and Black as part of an investment plan made by the Malaysian Owners, also the building of a training ground facility is announced to be built. The badge was also changed to feature a larger dragon, meaning the traditional Bluebird is made smaller as a result the Malaysian Owners have put more investment into Cardiff City.
- 29 June – Former chairman Sam Hammam rejects the three offers which Cardiff offer to deal with long-term "Langston Debt".

July

- 10 July – Cardiff enter talks with South Korean international Kim Bo-Kyung's club Cerezo Osaka over a transfer fee.
- 12 July – Under-18 Belgian international keeper Guillaume Hubert joins on trial along with three unnamed French players.
- 13 July – Cardiff agree a fee for Kim Bo-Kyung of around £3 million, as confirmed by his Kim's agent.
- 15 July – The Cardiff City squad travel to Switzerland for pre-season training. Bids from Fulham for Peter Whittingham are rejected.
- 19 July – Cardiff City pull out of bid for Coventry City defender Richard Keogh after refusing to get involved with a wage war with Derby County. A bid from an unnamed Championship club is rejected for Anthony Gerrard and Dulwich Hamlet teenager Omarr Lawson joins on trial.

August

- 2 August – Queens Park Rangers striker Heiðar Helguson takes part in a medical and discusses personal terms over a move to Cardiff.
- 3 August – A£200,000 bid is rejected from Bristol City and Leicester City for Anthony Gerrard.
- 10 August – Cardiff City Stadium officially re-opens as Cardiff take sole ownership of the ground.
- 20 August – A£500,000 bid for defender Matthew Connolly is accepted by Queens Park Rangers.
- 21 August – Cardiff's bid for Queens Park Rangers winger Tommy Smith stalls.
- 30 August – Cardiff agree a fee with West Ham for the transfer of Nicky Maynard.

September

- 12 September – Financial Director Doug Lee announces resignation at the end of the month with Simon Lim replacing him.
- 20 September – Nicky Maynard is ruled out for several months with a torn anterior cruciate ligament.

October

- 1 October – Alan Whiteley steps down as Chief Executive, Simon Lim replaces Whiteley whilst Richard Thompson steps in as acting financial director.
- 10 October – Academy Manager Neal Ardley leaves to take up a managerial position at AFC Wimbledon.

November

- 2 November – Dick Bate joins as a new academy manager.
- 16 November – Stephen Owen-Conway is appointed as a new club director.
- 23 November – Craig Conway puts in a transfer request, which is rejected by manager Malky Mackay.

January

- 24 January – Board director Alan Whiteley resigns following being charge for fraud.

March

- 1 March – Chairman Datuk Chan Tien Ghee resigns.

April

- 16 April – Cardiff City gain promotion to the Premier League after a 0–0 draw against Charlton Athletic. This marks Cardiff's return to the top flight after a 51-year absence.
- 20 April – Cardiff City become champions of the Football League Championship after a 1–1 draw away to Burnley.

May

- 24 May – Geraint Twose and Lee Kendall leave Cardiff City Academy to take up as Coach Education Role with the Football Association and first team goalkeeper coach at Bristol City respectively.

== Football League Championship ==
=== Standings ===
Pos	Team	Pld	W	D	L	GF	GA	GD	Pts	Promotion or relegation
1	Cardiff City (C, P)	46	25	12	9	72	45	+27	87	Promotion to the Premier League
2	Hull City (P)	46	24	7	15	61	52	+9	79	Promotion to the Premier League
3	Watford	46	23	8	15	85	58	+27	77	Qualification for Championship play-offs
4	Brighton & Hove Albion	46	19	18	9	69	43	+26	75	Qualification for Championship play-offs
5	Crystal Palace (O, P)	46	19	15	12	73	62	+11	72	Qualification for Championship play-offs

Updated to match(es) played on 4 May 2013. Source: BBC Sport
Rules for classification: 1) points; 2) goal difference; 3) number of goals scored.
(C) Champions; (O) Play-off winners; (P) Promoted

=== Results summary ===
Overall								Home						Away					
Pld	W	D	L	GF	GA	GD	Pts	W	D	L	GF	GA	GD	W	D	L	GF	GA	GD
46	25	12	9	72	45	+27	87	15	6	2	37	15	+22	10	6	7	35	30	+5

Last updated: 4 May 2013.
Source: Cardiff City FC

=== Result by round ===
Round	1	2	3	4	5	6	7	8	9	10	11	12	13	14	15	16	17	18	19	20	21	22	23	24	25	26	27	28	29	30	31	32	33	34	35	36	37	38	39	40	41	42	43	44	45	46
Ground	H	A	A	H	H	A	A	H	H	A	A	H	H	A	A	H	H	A	A	H	A	H	A	H	H	A	H	A	A	A	H	H	A	A	H	H	A	A	H	A	H	H	H	A	H	A
Result	W	D	L	W	W	W	L	W	W	W	L	W	W	L	L	W	W	W	D	W	W	L	W	W	W	W	D	W	W	D	W	L	W	L	D	D	W	L	W	D	D	W	D	D	D	D
Position	6	7	15	8	5	5	7	2	1	1	2	2	1	1	3	3	2	1	1	1	1	1	1	1	1	1	1	1	1	1	1	1	1	1	1	1	1	1	1	1	1	1	1	1	1	1

Updated to match(es) played on 4 May 2013. Source: Cardiff City FC
A = Away; H = Home; W = Win; D = Draw; L = Loss

== Kit ==
Supplier: Puma
Sponsor(s): Malaysia

Home	Home Alternate	Away	Away Alternate	Third	Third Alternate	GK Home	GK Away

Last updated: 11 September 2012.
Source: Historical Football Kit – NPower Championship 2012–13

== Squad ==
No.	Name	Position (s)	Nationality	Place of Birth	Date of birth (age)	Club caps	Club goals	Int. caps	Int. goals	Signed from	Date signed	Fee	Contract End
Goalkeepers
1	David Marshall	GK	(Scotland)	Glasgow	5 March 1985 (aged 28)	110	0	5	0	Norwich City	12 May 2009	£500,000	30 June 2015
29	Elliott Parish	GK	(England)	Towcester	20 May 1990 (aged 23)	–	–	–	–	Aston Villa	3 January 2012	Free	30 June 2013
32	Joe Lewis	GK	(England)	Bury St. Edmunds	6 October 1987 (aged 25)	–	–	–	–	Peterborough United	1 July 2012	Free	Undisclosed
Defenders
2	Kevin McNaughton	RB/LB/CB	(Scotland)	Dundee	28 August 1982 (aged 30)	255	2	4	0	Aberdeen	26 May 2006	Free	30 June 2013
3	Andrew Taylor	LB/LM	(England)	Hartlepool	1 August 1986 (aged 26)	52	2	–	–	Middlesbrough	4 July 2011	Free	30 June 2016
5	Mark Hudson	CB	(England)	Guildford	30 March 1982 (aged 31)	123	7	–	–	Charlton Athletic	2 July 2009	£1,075,000	30 June 2014
6	Ben Turner	CB	(England)	Birmingham	21 August 1988 (aged 24)	43	3	–	–	Coventry City	31 August 2011	£750,000	30 June 2016
12	Matthew Connolly	CB/RB	(England)	Barnet	24 September 1987 (aged 25)	–	–	–	–	Queens Park Rangers	22 August 2012	£500,000	30 June 2015
31	Ben Nugent	CB	(England)	Welwyn Garden City	23 July 1993 (aged 19)	–	–	–	–	Academy	1 July 2012	Trainee	30 June 2016
35	Adedeji Oshilaja	RB/LB/CB	(England)	Lambeth	23 February 1993 (aged 20)	1	–	–	–	Academy	1 July 2012	Trainee	30 June 2013
40	Luke Coulson	LB	(England)	St Helens	6 March 1994 (aged 19)	–	–	–	–	Tottenham Hotspur	2 November 2012	Free	30 June 2013
Midfieldes
4	Filip Kiss	DM/RM	(Slovakia)	Dunajská Streda	13 October 1990 (aged 22)	33	1	–	–	Slovan Bratislava	1 July 2012	£500,000	30 June 2016
7	Peter Whittingham	CM/LM/RM	(England)	Nuneaton	8 September 1984 (aged 28)	266	68	–	–	Aston Villa	11 January 2007	£350,000	30 June 2015
8	Don Cowie	RM/CM	(Scotland)	Inverness	15 February 1983 (aged 30)	53	7	9	0	Watford	1 July 2011	Free	30 June 2014
11	Craig Conway	LW/RW	(Scotland)	Irvine	2 May 1985 (aged 28)	38	5	3	0	Dundee United	23 June 2011	Free	30 June 2014
13	Kim Bo-Kyung	AM/RW/LW	(South Korea)	Gurye	6 October 1989 (aged 23)	–	–	14	2	Cerezo Osaka	27 July 2012	£2,000,000	30 June 2015
16	Craig Noone	LW/RW	(England)	Kirkby	17 November 1987 (aged 25)	–	–	–	–	Brighton & Hove Albion	30 August 2012	£1,000,000	30 June 2016
17	Aron Gunnarsson	DM/RB	(Iceland)	Akureyri	22 April 1988 (aged 25)	50	5	28	0	Coventry City	8 July 2011	£350,000	30 June 2016
18	Jordon Mutch	CM/LM	(England)	Alvaston	2 December 1991 (aged 21)	–	–	–	–	Birmingham City	22 June 2012	£2,000,000	30 June 2015
19	Kadeem Harris	LW/RW	(England)	Westminster	29 May 1993 (aged 20)	–	–	–	–	Wycombe Wanderers	30 January 2012	£150,000	30 June 2015
21	Joe Ralls	CM/LM/LB	(England)	Aldershot	13 October 1992 (aged 20)	14	1	–	–	Academy	30 September 2011	Trainee	Undisclosed
24	Simon Lappin	LM/LB	(Scotland)	Glasgow	25 January 1983 (aged 30)	–	–	–	–	Norwich City	29 January 2013	Free	30 June 2014
37	Stephen McPhail	CM/LM	(Republic of Ireland)	Westminster (England)	9 December 1979 (aged 33)	220	3	10	1	Barnsley	13 June 2006	Free	30 June 2013
Forwards
9	Etien Velikonja	CF	(Slovenia)	Šempeter pri Gorici	26 December 1988 (aged 24)	–	–	2	0	Maribor	25 July 2012	£1,574,373	30 June 2016
14	Tommy Smith	RW/LW/CF	(England)	Hemel Hempstead	22 May 1980 (aged 33)	–	–	–	–	Queens Park Rangers	24 August 2012	£300,000	30 June 2014
15	Rudy Gestede	CF	(Benin)	Essey-lès-Nancy (France)	10 October 1988 (aged 24)	31	3	–	–	Metz	26 July 2011	Free	30 June 2014
20	Joe Mason	CF/LW	(Republic of Ireland)	Plymouth (England)	13 May 1991 (aged 22)	46	12	–	–	Plymouth Argyle	10 July 2011	£250,000	30 June 2016
22	Heiðar Helguson	CF	(Iceland)	Dalvík	22 August 1977 (aged 35)	–	–	55	12	Queens Park Rangers	2 August 2012	Free	30 June 2013
23	Nicky Maynard	CF	(England)	Winsford	11 December 1986 (aged 26)	–	–	–	–	West Ham United	31 August 2012	£2,500,000	30 June 2015
27	Fraizer Campbell	CF/LW	(England)	Huddersfield	13 September 1987 (aged 25)	–	–	1	0	Sunderland	21 January 2013	£650,000	30 June 2016
28	Rhys Healey	CF	(England)	Manchester	6 December 1994 (aged 18)	–	–	–	–	Gap Connah's Quay	28 January 2013	£25,000	30 June 2015
33	Nathaniel Jarvis	CF	(Wales)	Cardiff	20 October 1991 (aged 21)	1	1	–	–	Academy	1 July 2011	Trainee	30 June 2013
34	Jesse Darko	RW/CF	(Austria)		13 March 1993 (aged 20)	–	–	–	–	Academy	1 July 2012	Trainee	30 June 2013
39	Craig Bellamy	LW/CF	(Wales)	Cardiff	13 July 1979 (aged 33)	35	11	69	19	Liverpool	10 August 2012	Free	30 June 2014

=== Statistics ===
As of 4 May 2013

No.	Pos	Nat	Player	Total		Championship		FA Cup		League Cup	
No.	Pos	Nat	Player	Apps	Goals	Apps	Goals	Apps	Goals	Apps	Goals
1	GK	(Scotland) SCO	David Marshall	46	0	46	0	0	0	0	0
2	DF	(Scotland) SCO	Kevin McNaughton	28	0	24+3	0	1	0	0	0
3	DF	(England) ENG	Andrew Taylor	43	0	43	0	0	0	0	0
4	MF	(Slovakia) SVK	Filip Kiss	3	0	0+2	0	1	0	0	0
5	DF	(England) ENG	Mark Hudson	33	4	33	4	0	0	0	0
6	DF	(England) ENG	Ben Turner	31	1	30+1	1	0	0	0	0
7	MF	(England) ENG	Peter Whittingham	40	8	37+3	8	0	0	0	0
8	MF	(Scotland) SCO	Don Cowie	24	2	15+9	2	0	0	0	0
9	FW	(Slovenia) SLO	Etien Velikonja	3	0	1+2	0	0	0	0	0
11	MF	(Scotland) SCO	Craig Conway	28	2	21+6	2	0	0	1	0
12	DF	(England) ENG	Matthew Connolly	36	5	36	5	0	0	0	0
13	MF	(South Korea) KOR	Kim Bo-Kyung	28	2	20+8	2	0	0	0	0
14	FW	(England) ENG	Tommy Smith	23	1	18+5	1	0	0	0	0
15	FW	(Benin) BEN	Rudy Gestede	27	5	5+22	5	0	0	0	0
16	MF	(England) ENG	Craig Noone	31	7	25+6	7	0	0	0	0
17	MF	(Iceland) ISL	Aron Gunnarsson	45	8	35+10	8	0	0	0	0
18	MF	(England) ENG	Jordon Mutch	23	0	18+4	0	0	0	0+1	0
19	MF	(England) ENG	Kadeem Harris	1	0	0	0	1	0	0	0
20	FW	(Republic of Ireland) IRL	Joe Mason	29	6	12+16	6	0	0	1	0
21	MF	(England) ENG	Joe Ralls	6	0	1+3	0	1	0	1	0
22	FW	(Iceland) ISL	Heiðar Helguson	39	9	27+11	8	0	0	1	1
23	FW	(England) ENG	Nicky Maynard	4	1	3+1	1	0	0	0	0
24	MF	(Scotland) SCO	Simon Lappin	2	0	2	0	0	0	0	0
27	FW	(England) ENG	Fraizer Campbell	12	7	9+3	7	0	0	0	0
28	FW	(Wales) WAL	Rhys Healey	0	0	0	0	0	0	0	0
29	GK	(England) ENG	Elliot Parish	0	0	0	0	0	0	0	0
31	DF	(England) ENG	Ben Nugent	14	1	7+5	1	1	0	1	0
32	GK	(England) ENG	Joe Lewis	2	0	0	0	1	0	1	0
35	DF	(England) ENG	Adedeji Oshilaja	2	0	0	0	1	0	1	0
37	MF	(Republic of Ireland) IRL	Stephen McPhail	2	0	0	0	1	0	1	0
38	MF	(Wales) WAL	Tommy O'Sullivan	2	0	0	0	0+1	0	0+1	0
39	FW	(Wales) WAL	Craig Bellamy	33	4	28+5	4	0	0	0	0
40	DF	(England) ENG	Luke Coulson	1	0	0	0	0+1	0	0	0
42	DF	(Wales) WAL	Declan John	2	0	0	0	1	0	1	0
45	MF	(Wales) WAL	Theo Wharton	1	0	0	0	0+1	0	0	0
Players currently out on loan:
33	FW	(Wales) WAL	Nathaniel Jarvis (at Kidderminster Harriers)	2	1	0	0	1	1	0+1	0
34	FW	(Austria) AUT	Jesse Darko (at AFC Wimbledon)	0	0	0	0	0	0	0	0
Players featured for club who have left:
25	DF	(England) ENG	Leon Barnett (on loan from Norwich City)	8	0	8	0	0	0	0	0
25	MF	(Turkey) TUR	Kerim Frei (on loan from Fulham)	3	0	1+2	0	0	0	0	0
28	DF	(Israel) ISR	Dekel Keinan	1	0	0	0	0	0	1	0
36	MF	(Guadeloupe) GLP	Kevin Sainte-Luce	1	0	0	0	0	0	1	0

==== Captains ====
No.	P	Name	Country	No. games	Notes
5	DF	Mark Hudson	(England)	32	Club captain
39	FW	Craig Bellamy	(Wales)	8	
3	DF	Andrew Taylor	(England)	3	
7	MF	Peter Whittingham	(England)	3	
37	MF	Stephen McPhail	(Republic of Ireland)	2	

Last updated: 4 May 2013
Source: Competitive match reports.
Competitive matches only
Matches started as captain only
Country: FIFA nationality; No.: Squad number; P: Position; Name: Player name; No. Games: Number of games started as captain.

==== Goalscorers ====
Rank	No.	Pos.	Name	Championship	FA Cup	League Cup	Total
1	22	FW	Heiðar Helguson	8	0	1	9
2	7	MF	Peter Whittingham	8	0	0	8
2	17	MF	Aron Gunnarsson	8	0	0	8
4	16	MF	Craig Noone	7	0	0	7
4	27	FW	Fraizer Campbell	7	0	0	7
6	20	FW	Joe Mason	6	0	0	6
7	12	DF	Matthew Connolly	5	0	0	5
7	15	FW	Rudy Gestede	5	0	0	5
9	5	DF	Mark Hudson	4	0	0	4
9	39	FW	Craig Bellamy	4	0	0	4
11	8	MF	Don Cowie	2	0	0	2
11	11	MF	Craig Conway	2	0	0	2
13	13	MF	Kim Bo-Kyung	2	0	0	2
14	6	DF	Ben Turner	1	0	0	1
14	14	FW	Tommy Smith	1	0	0	1
14	23	FW	Nicky Maynard	1	0	0	1
14	31	DF	Ben Nugent	1	0	0	1
14	33	FW	Nathaniel Jarvis	0	1	0	1
Total				72	1	1	74

==== Assists ====
Rank	No.	Po.	Name	Championship	FA Cup	League Cup	Total
1	39	FW	Craig Bellamy	10	0	0	10
2	16	MF	Craig Noone	9	0	0	9
3	3	DF	Andrew Taylor	6	0	0	6
3	7	MF	Peter Whittingham	6	0	0	6
5	17	MF	Aron Gunnarsson	5	0	0	5
6	22	FW	Heiðar Helguson	4	0	0	4
7	13	MF	Kim Bo-Kyung	3	0	0	3
7	15	FW	Rudy Gestede	3	0	0	3
7	23	FW	Nicky Maynard	3	0	0	3
10	6	DF	Ben Turner	2	0	0	2
10	14	MF	Tommy Smith	2	0	0	2
12	11	MF	Craig Conway	1	0	0	1
12	5	DF	Mark Hudson	1	0	0	1
12	42	DF	Declan John	0	1	0	1
12	20	FW	Joe Mason	1	0	0	1
12	1	GK	David Marshall	1	0	0	1
12	2	DF	Kevin McNaughton	1	0	0	1

==== Disciplinary record ====
No.	Pos.	Name	Championship		FA Cup		League Cup		Total	
No.	Pos.	Name	Yellow card	Red card	Yellow card	Red card	Yellow card	Red card	Yellow card	Red card
1	GK	David Marshall	3	0	0	0	0	0	3	0
2	DF	Kevin McNaughton	2	0	1	0	0	0	3	0
3	DF	Andrew Taylor	3	1	0	0	0	0	3	1
5	DF	Mark Hudson	8	0	0	0	0	0	8	0
6	DF	Ben Turner	5	0	0	0	0	0	5	0
7	MF	Peter Whittingham	5	0	0	0	0	0	5	0
8	MF	Don Cowie	3	0	0	0	0	0	3	0
9	FW	Etien Velikonja	1	0	0	0	0	0	1	0
11	MF	Craig Conway	1	0	0	0	0	0	1	0
12	DF	Matthew Connolly	5	0	0	0	0	0	5	0
13	MF	Kim Bo-Kyung	3	0	0	0	0	0	3	0
14	FW	Tommy Smith	3	0	0	0	0	0	3	0
16	MF	Craig Noone	4	1	0	0	0	0	4	1
17	MF	Aron Gunnarsson	7	0	0	0	0	0	7	0
18	MF	Jordon Mutch	7	0	0	0	0	0	7	0
20	FW	Joe Mason	1	0	0	0	0	0	1	0
22	FW	Heiðar Helguson	4	0	0	0	0	0	4	0
24	MF	Simon Lappin	1	1	0	0	0	0	1	1
~~25~~	DF	Leon Barnett	1	0	0	0	0	0	1	0
31	DF	Ben Nugent	4	0	0	0	0	0	4	0
35	DF	Adedeji Oshilaja	0	0	0	0	1	0	1	0
36	MF	Kevin Sainte-Luce	0	0	0	0	1	0	1	0
39	FW	Craig Bellamy	4	0	0	0	0	0	4	0
Total			72	3	1	0	2	0	75	3

==== Penalties ====
Date	Penalty Taker	Scored	Opponent	Competition
14 August 2012	Heiðar Helguson	Yes	Northampton Town	League Cup
2 September 2012	Peter Whittingham	Yes	Wolverhampton Wanderers	Championship
15 September 2012	Peter Whittingham	Yes	Leeds United	Championship
23 October 2012	Peter Whittingham	Yes	Watford	Championship
1 April 2013	Peter Whittingham	Yes	Blackburn Rovers	Championship
4 May 2013	Nicky Maynard	Yes	Hull City	Championship

==== Suspensions served ====
Date	Matches Missed	Player	Reason	Opponents Missed
24 November 2012	1	Simon Lappin	(yellow card) (yellow-red card) vs Barnsley	Derby (A)
27 November 2012	1	Craig Noone	(yellow card) (yellow-red card) vs Derby County	Sheff Wed (H)
2 December 2012	1	Jordon Mutch	5× (yellow card)	Blackburn (A)
7 December 2012	1	Mark Hudson	5× (yellow card)	Peterborough (H)
22 December 2012	1	Matthew Connolly	5× (yellow card)	Crystal Palace (H)
4 May 2013	1	Andrew Taylor	(yellow card) (yellow-red card) vs Hull City	First Premier League fixture (TBC)

=== International Call-ups ===
As of 10 June 2013

No.	P	Name	Country	Level	Caps	Goals	Notes	Source
1	GK	David Marshall	Scotland	Senior	1	0		
4	MF	Filip Kiss	Slovakia	U21	4	0		
8	MF	Don Cowie	Scotland	Senior	1	0		
9	FW	Etien Velikonja	Slovenia	Senior	1	0		
11	MF	Craig Conway	Scotland	Senior	1	0		
13	MF	Kim Bo-Kyung	South Korea	Olympic Team	5	1	Won bronze in Olympics	
13	MF	Kim Bo-Kyung	South Korea	Senior	3	0		
15	FW	Rudy Gestede	Benin	Senior	2	2		
17	MF	Aron Gunnarsson	Iceland	Senior	7	0		
~~23~~	DF	Darcy Blake	Wales	Senior	1	0		
~~25~~	MF	Kerim Frei	Turkey	Senior	1	0		
39	FW	Craig Bellamy	Wales	Senior	4	0		

=== Contracts ===
No.	Pos.	Nat.	Name	Age	Status	Contract length	Expiry date	Source
22	GK	(England)	Tom Heaton	26	Rejected	3 years	June 2015	BBC Sport
1	GK	(Scotland)	David Marshall	27	Signed	3 years	June 2015	Official site
23	DF	(Wales)	Darcy Blake	23	Rejected	Undisclosed	Undisclosed	BBC Sport
7	MF	(England)	Peter Whittingham	27	Signed	3 years	June 2015	Cardiff City FC
3	DF	(England)	Andrew Taylor	26	Signed	4 years	June 2016	BBC Sport
6	DF	(England)	Ben Turner	24	Signed	4 years	June 2016	Cardiff City FC
31	DF	(England)	Ben Nugent	20	Signed	3 1/2 years	June 2016	Cardiff City FC
17	MF	(Iceland)	Aron Gunnarsson	23	Signed	3 years	June 2016	BBC Sport

== Transfers ==
=== In ===
No.	Pos.	Nat.	Name	Age	EU	Moving from	Type	Transfer window	Ends	Transfer fee	Source
32	GK	(England)	Joe Lewis	24	EU	Peterborough United (England)	Free	Summer	2015^{1}	Free	BBC Sport
4	MF	(Slovakia)	Filip Kiss	21	EU	Slovan Bratislava (Slovakia)	Transfer	Summer	2016	£500,000	South Wales Echo
18	MF	(England)	Jordon Mutch	20	EU	Birmingham City (England)	Transfer	Summer	2015	£2,000,000^{2}	Cardiff City FC
9	FW	(Slovenia)	Etien Velikonja	23	EU	Maribor (Slovenia)	Transfer	Summer	2016	£1,574,373^{3}	BBC Sport
13	MF	(South Korea)	Kim Bo-Kyung	22	Non-EU	Cerezo Osaka (Japan)	Transfer	Summer	2015	£2,000,000	Sky Sports
22	FW	(Iceland)	Heiðar Helguson	34	EU	Queens Park Rangers (England)	Free	Summer	2013	Free^{4}	Cardiff City FC
39	FW	(Wales)	Craig Bellamy	33	EU	Liverpool (England)	Transfer	Summer	2014	Free	BBC Sport
12	DF	(England)	Matthew Connolly	24	EU	Queens Park Rangers (England)	Transfer	Summer	2015	£500,000	BBC Sport
14	FW	(England)	Tommy Smith	32	EU	Queens Park Rangers (England)	Transfer	Summer	2014	£300,000^{5}	Cardiff City FC
16	MF	(England)	Craig Noone	24	EU	Brighton & Hove Albion (England)	Transfer	Summer	2016	£1,000,000	BBC Sport
23	FW	(England)	Nicky Maynard	25	EU	West Ham United (England)	Transfer	Summer	2015	£2,500,000	BBC Sport
44	MF	(Sierra Leone)	Ibrahim Mansaray	19	EU	Free agent	Free		2013	Free	South Wales Echo
40	DF	(England)	Luke Coulson	18	EU	Manchester City (England)	Free		2013	Free	Cardiff City FC
	MF	(Republic of Ireland)	Ronnie Hawkins	18	EU	Tottenham Hotspur (England)	Free		2013	Free	Cardiff City FC
27	FW	(England)	Fraizer Campbell	25	EU	Sunderland (England)	Transfer	Winter	2016	£650,000	BBC Sport
28	FW	(Wales)	Rhys Healey	18	EU	Connah's Quay Nomads (Wales)	Transfer	Winter	2015	£25,000^{6}	Cardiff City FC
24	MF	(Scotland)	Simon Lappin	30	EU	Norwich City (England)	Free transfer	Winter	2014	Free	BBC Sport

- Total spending: ▼ ~ £10,049,373

Notes

^{1}Although Cardiff didn't specify a contract length, South Wales Echo reported the contract to be three years ending in 2015.
^{2}Although neither club stated a transfer fee, the South Wales Echo reported the fee to be in the excess of a £2,000,000.
^{3}Although officially undisclosed, Zlatko Zahovič, director of Maribor confirmed the fee to be around €2 million (£1,573,373), a record in Slovenian football.
^{4}Although officially undisclosed South Wales Echo reported the transfer to be a free transfer.
^{5}Although officially undisclosed South Wales Echo reported the fee to be £300,000.
^{6}Although officially undisclosed South Wales Echo reported the fee to be £25,000.

=== Loans in ===
No.	Pos.	Name	Country	Age	Loan club	Started	Ended	Start source	End source
25	MF	Kerim Frei	(Turkey) (Austria)	19	Fulham	26 October	22 November	BBC Sport	Fulham Chronicle
24	MF	Simon Lappin	(Scotland)	29	Norwich City	21 November	2 January	BBC Sport	BBC Sport
25	DF	Leon Barnett	(England)	27	Norwich City	14 March	23 April	BBC Sport	Cardiff City Official Site

Sources: For loan start source see "Start source". For loan end source see "End source".
EU = if holds or not a European Union passport; Country: when 2 flags, 1st flag = country that plays for internationally, 2nd flag = country of birth; No. = number on jersey; P = Position (for position name, pause mouse pointer on abbreviation); Name = Name on jersey (for more extensive name, pause mouse pointer on name); In/Out = In: The player came in on loan, Out: The player went out on loan; Loan club = the club that the player moved on loan to or the club that the player came from on loan; Started = the date when the player's loan started; Ended = the date when the player's loan ended.

=== Out ===
No.	Pos.	Name	Country	Age	Type	Moving to	Transfer window	Transfer fee	Apps	Goals	Source
31	DF	Alex Evans	(Wales)	21	Contract ended	Oxford United (England)	Summer	Free	1	0	Sky Sports
22	GK	Tom Heaton	(England)	26	Contract ended	Bristol City (England)	Summer	Free	64	0	BBC Sport
21	DF	Jonathan Meades	(Wales)	20	Contract ended	Bournemouth (England)	Summer	Free	0	0	BBC Sport
18	DF	Lee Naylor	(England)	32	Contract ended	Free agent	Summer	Free	36	2	BBC Sport
14	DF	Paul Quinn	(Scotland)	26	Contract ended	Doncaster Rovers (England)	Summer	Free	61	1	BBC Sport
30	GK	Jordan Santiago	(Canada)	21	Contract ended	Free agent	Summer	Free	0	0	Sky Sports
28	MF	Aaron Wildig	(England)	20	Contract ended	Shrewsbury Town (England)	Summer	Free	21	1	BBC Sport
24	MF	Solomon Taiwo	(Nigeria)	27	Contract ended	Mansfield Town	Summer	Free	12	0	Mansfield Town FC
16	FW	Jon Parkin	(England)	30	Contract terminated	Fleetwood Town (England)	Summer	Free	15	2	BBC Sport
9	FW	Kenny Miller	(Scotland)	32	Transfer	Vancouver Whitecaps FC (Canada)	Summer	Undisclosed	50	11	Official Site
27	DF	Anthony Gerrard	(England)	26	Transfer	Huddersfield Town (England)	Summer	£350,000^{1}	74	4	Huddersfield Town FC
23	DF	Darcy Blake	(Wales)	23	Transfer	Crystal Palace (England)	Summer	£350,000	118	0	South Wales Echo
33	MF	Ibrahim Farah	(Wales)	20	Contract terminated	Free agent	Summer	Free	1	0	Twitter
28	DF	Dekel Keinan	(Israel)	27	Contract terminated	Maccabi Haifa (Israel)	Summer	Free	24	2	Jerusalem Post
26	MF	Kevin Sainte-Luce	(Guadeloupe)	19	Contract terminated	AFC Wimbledon (England)	Winter	Free	1	0	BBC Sport
10	FW	Robert Earnshaw	(Wales) (Zambia)	31	Transfer	Toronto FC (Canada)		Undisclosed	227	109	Sky Sports

EU = if holds or not a European Union passport; Country: when 2 flags, 1st flag = country that plays for internationally, 2nd flag = country of birth; N = number on jersey; P = Position (for position name, pause mouse pointer on abbreviation); Name = Name on jersey (for more extensive name, pause mouse pointer on name); Age = age on the day of the signing; Moving from = only indicate the club the player was playing before start playing for this club in this season, for the type of the moving see Status column; Moving to = only indicates the club the player is going to play next, for the type of the moving see Status column; Ends = when the player's current contract ends; n/a = Not applicable; Apps = Total number of competitive appearances (including substitute appearances) at the club prior to departure; Goals = Total number of competitive goals scored at the club prior to departure.
- Total income: ▲ ~ £1,263,200

Notes

^{1}Both sides published the fee as undisclosed, but BBC Sport reported the transfer to be worth £350,000.

=== Loans out ===
No.	Pos.	Name	Country	Age	Loan club	Started	Ended	Start source	End source
29	GK	Elliot Parish	(England)	22	Wycombe Wanderers	18 September	25 September	BBC Sport	Wycombe Wanderers FC
10	FW	Robert Earnshaw	(Wales) (Zambia)	31	Maccabi Tel Aviv	20 September	4 January	BBC Sport	BBC Sport
33	FW	Nathaniel Jarvis	(Wales)	21	Forest Green Rovers	20 November	5 January	BBC Sport	BBC Sport
33	FW	Nathaniel Jarvis	(Wales)	21	Kidderminster Harriers	31 January	31 May	BBC Sport	
34	FW	Jesse Darko	(Austria)	19	AFC Wimbledon	21 February		BBC Sport	

Sources: For loan start source see "Start source". For loan end source see "End source".
EU = if holds or not a European Union passport; Country: when 2 flags, 1st flag = country that plays for internationally, 2nd flag = country of birth; No. = number on jersey; P = Position (for position name, pause mouse pointer on abbreviation); Name = Name on jersey (for more extensive name, pause mouse pointer on name); In/Out = In: The player came in on loan, Out: The player went out on loan; Loan club = the club that the player moved on loan to or the club that the player came from on loan; Started = the date when the player's loan started; Ended = the date when the player's loan ended.

== Fixtures & Results ==
=== Pre-season ===
28 July	Forest Green Rovers	1–0	Cardiff City	Nailsworth
15:00 BST	Koroma 26'	report		Stadium: The New Lawn; Attendance: 1519

31 July	Cheltenham Town	0–4	Cardiff City	Cheltenham
19:45 BST		report	28' Taylor; 30' Earnshaw; 43' Conway; 50' Whittingham	Stadium: Whaddon Road

4 August	Oxford United	1–2	Cardiff City	Oxford
15:00 BST	Potter 74'	report	16' Whittingham; 62' Kiss	Stadium: Kassam Stadium; Attendance: 1,809

7 August	Bournemouth	1–2	Cardiff City	Bournemouth
19:45 BST	Wakefield 36'	Report	40' Whittingham; 53' Helguson	Stadium: Dean Court

11 August	Cardiff City	4–1	Newcastle United	Cardiff
15:00 BST	Gunnarsson 16', 26'; Ralls 20'; Velikonja 72'	Report	50' Ameobi	Stadium: Cardiff City Stadium

=== Championship ===
17 August 2012 1	Cardiff City	1–0	Huddersfield Town	Cardiff
19:45 BST	Whittingham (yellow card) 73'; Cowie (substituted off) Mason (substituted on) 78'; Mutch (substituted off) Kiss (substituted on) 85'; Hudson 90+1'	Report	(yellow card) 52' Clayton; (yellow card) 58' Southern; (substituted off) 90+2' Arfield (substituted on) Gerrard; (substituted off) 90+4' Scannell (substituted on) Spencer; (yellow card) 90+5' Gerrard	Stadium: Cardiff City Stadium; Attendance: 21,127; Referee: Roger East

21 August 2012 2	Brighton & Hove Albion	0–0	Cardiff City	Brighton
19:45 BST	Barnes (substituted off) LuaLua (substituted on) 63'; Noone (substituted off) Vicente (substituted on) 82'; Dicker (substituted off) Harley (substituted on) 82'	Report	(yellow card) 17' Mutch; (substituted off) 46' Mutch (substituted on) Mason; (substituted off) 72' Bellamy (substituted on) Conway; (substituted off) 77' Helguson (substituted on) Velikonja	Stadium: Falmer Stadium; Attendance: 25,518; Referee: Mark Halsey

25 August 2012 3	Bristol City	4–2	Cardiff City	Bristol
13:00 BST	Pearson 32'; Woolford 45+1', 70'; Stead (substituted off) Baldock (substituted on) 64'; Taylor (substituted off) Elliott (substituted on) 74'; Adomah (substituted off) Davies (substituted on) 84'; Baldock 87'	Report	(substituted off) 46' Gunnarsson (substituted on) Mason; 57' Mason; (substituted off) 75' Smith (substituted on) Velikonja; (substituted off) 80' Mutch (substituted on) Ralls; 82' Helguson; (yellow card) 90+4' Velikonja	Stadium: Ashton Gate; Attendance: 14,368; Referee: Mike Jones

2 September 2012 4	Cardiff City	3–1	Wolverhampton Wanderers	Cardiff
14:00 BST	Whittingham 11' (pen.), 14', 65'; Mutch (yellow card) 18'; Mutch (substituted off) Gunnarsson (substituted on) 58'; Maynard (substituted off) Mason (substituted on) 68'; Noone (substituted off) Cowie (substituted on) 73'	Report	10' Sako; (yellow card) 49' Ebanks-Blake; (substituted off) 73' Zubar (substituted on) Stearman; (substituted off) 73' Edwards (substituted on) Nouble; (substituted off) 83' Peszko (substituted on) Forde	Stadium: Cardiff City Stadium; Attendance: 22,020; Referee: Andy D'Urso

15 September 2012 5	Cardiff City	2–1	Leeds United	Cardiff
15:00 BST	Smith (yellow card) 39'; Noone (substituted off) Bellamy (substituted on) 64'; Bellamy 67'; Whittingham 73' (pen.); Mutch (substituted off) Gunnarsson (substituted on) 76'; Maynard (substituted off) Cowie (substituted on) 83'	Report	(substituted off) 5' McCormack (substituted on) Varney; (yellow card) 38' Austin; (substituted off) 46' Drury (substituted on) Diouf; (yellow card) 67' Tonge; 77' Austin; (substituted off) 83' Varney (substituted on) Poleon	Stadium: Cardiff City Stadium; Attendance: 23,836; Referee: Paul Tierney

18 September 2012 6	Millwall	0–2	Cardiff City	Millwall
19:45 BST	Dunne (yellow card) 48'; Lowry (yellow card) 49'; Henderson (substituted off) Wood (substituted on) 57'; Wright (substituted off) C Taylor (substituted on) 57'; Henry (substituted off) Batt (substituted on) 78'	Report	53' Whittingham; 55' Noone; (yellow card) 67' Smith; (substituted off) 67' Maynard (substituted on) Helguson; (yellow card) 74' McNaughton; (substituted off) 79' Noone (substituted on) Kim	Stadium: The Den; Attendance: 9,295; Referee: Simon Hooper

22 September 2012 7	Crystal Palace	3–2	Cardiff City	London
15:00 BST	Ramage (substituted off) Ward (substituted on) 29'; Zaha (yellow card) 45+2'; Murray 52' (pen.), 62', 72' (pen.)	Report	13' (yellow card) 66' Gunnarsson; 15' Cowie; (yellow card) 35' McNaughton; (substituted off) 75' Cowie (substituted on) Noone; (substituted off) 81' Bellamy (substituted on) Mason; (substituted off) 88' Smith (substituted on) Kim; (yellow card) 90+2' Kim	Stadium: Selhurst Park; Attendance: 12,757; Referee: Gavin Ward

29 September 2012 8	Cardiff City	3–0	Blackpool	Cardiff
15:00 BST	Connolly 17', 57'; Smith (substituted off) Mason (substituted on) 25'; Whittingham 27'; Bellamy (substituted off) Kim (substituted on) 72'; Helguson (substituted off) Cowie (substituted on) 80'; Hudson (yellow card) 90'; Cowie (yellow card) 90+4'	Report	(substituted off) 58' Sylvestre (substituted on) Delfouneso; (substituted off) 59' Robertson (substituted on) Osbourne; (substituted off) 60' Dicko (substituted on) Eccleston; (yellow card) 61' Crainey; (yellow card) 75' Evatt	Stadium: Cardiff City Stadium; Attendance: 21,216; Referee: Carl Boyeson

2 October 2012 9	Cardiff City	2–1	Birmingham City	Cardiff
19:45 BST	Bellamy 39'; Hudson (yellow card) 53' (goal) 57'; Bellamy (yellow card) 71'; Bellamy (substituted off) Cowie (substituted on) 79'; Noone (substituted off) Kim (substituted on) 84'	Report	(substituted off) 52' Packwood (substituted on) Hurst; 54' Lita; (yellow card) 56' Davies; (substituted off) 66' Lita (substituted on) King; (substituted off) 74' Løvenkrands (substituted on) Redmond	Stadium: Cardiff City Stadium; Attendance: 20,278; Referee: Kevin Friend

6 October 2012 10	Ipswich Town	1–2	Cardiff City	Ipswich
17:20 BST	Drury (yellow card) 42'; Campbell 45+1'; Campbell (substituted off) Scotland (substituted on) 59'; Wellens (substituted off) Luongo (substituted on) 73'; Murphy (substituted off) Bilel (substituted on) 90'	Report	(substituted off) 55' Noone (substituted on) Conway; 63', 88' Helguson; (substituted off) 64' Mason (substituted on) Gestede; (substituted off) 90' McNaughton (substituted on) Turner	Stadium: Portman Road; Attendance: 16,434; Referee: Eddie Ilderton

20 October 2012 11	Nottingham Forest	3–1	Cardiff City	Nottingham
15:00 BST	Reid 26'; Ayala 27'; Cox (yellow card) 45+2'; Cox (substituted off) Majewski (substituted on) 46'; Sharp 47'; Guedioura (yellow card) 58' (yellow-red card) 84'; Reid (substituted off) Moussi (substituted on) 74'; Majewski (substituted off) Moloney (substituted on) 88'	Report	(yellow card) 45' Connolly; (substituted off) 62' Craig Conway (substituted on) Noone; (substituted off) 65' Gunnarsson (substituted on) Gestede; 74' Helguson; (substituted off) 81' McNaughton (substituted on) Mason; (yellow card) 90' Hudson	Stadium: City Ground; Attendance: 21,491; Referee: Darren Drysdale

23 October 2012 12	Cardiff City	2–1	Watford	Cardiff
19:45 BST	Bellamy (substituted off) Mason (substituted on) 46'; Hudson (yellow card) 56'; Whittingham 71' (pen.); Turner (substituted off) Gestede (substituted on) 73'; Smith (substituted off) Gunnarsson (substituted on) 84'; Gunnarsson 90+1'	Report	(yellow card) 18' Cassetti; 28' Hoban; (yellow card) 34' (yellow-red card) 72' Chalobah; (substituted off) 60' Vydra (substituted on) Anya; (red card) 64' Pudil; (yellow card) 70' Yeates; (substituted off) 71' Cassetti (substituted on) Thompson; (substituted off) 73' Geigo (substituted on) Deeney	Stadium: Cardiff City Stadium; Attendance: 20,077; Referee: Mark Haywood

27 October 2012 13	Cardiff City	4–0	Burnley	Cardiff
15:00 BST	Mason 3'; Noone 41'; Helguson (substituted off) Gestede (substituted on) 63'; Kim (substituted off) Gunnarsson (substituted on) 78'; Connolly 82'; Noone (substituted off) Frei (substituted on) 83'; Gunnarsson 85'	Report	(substituted off) 46' Stanislas (substituted on) Vokes; (yellow card) 53' Mills; (substituted off) 72' Paterson (substituted on) Ings; (substituted off) 78' Stock (substituted on) Stewart	Stadium: Cardiff City Stadium; Attendance: 21,191; Referee: Nigel Miller

3 November 2012 14	Bolton Wanderers	2–1	Cardiff City	Bolton
15:00 GMT	Pratley (substituted off) Petrov (substituted on) 57'; Warnock (yellow card) 60'; K Davies (substituted off) Ngog (substituted on) 63'; Petrov 69' (pen.); Lee (yellow card) 69'; Ngog 74' (yellow card) 84' (yellow-red card) 90+1'; Lee (substituted off) Ream (substituted on) 79'	Report	(yellow card) 34' Connolly; 40' Noone; (substituted off) 63' Helguson (substituted on) Gestede; (substituted off) 70' Kim (substituted on) Gunnarsson; (substituted off) 83' Mason (substituted on) Frei	Stadium: Reebok Stadium; Attendance: 17,304; Referee: Tony Bates

6 November 2012 15	Charlton Athletic	5–4	Cardiff City	London
19:45 GMT	Pritchard (yellow card) 32'; Jackson 39', 45+2'; Stephens 54' (yellow card) 86'; Haynes 59'; Morrison (yellow card) 60'; Hulse 65'; Haynes (substituted off) Wright-Phillips (substituted on) 68'; Solly (yellow card) 73'; Stephens (substituted off) Hollands (substituted on) 90'		4' Helguson; 24' Mason; (yellow card) 44' Connolly; (yellow card) 60' Taylor; (substituted off) 65' Cowie (substituted on) Gunnarsson; (substituted off) 65' Frei (substituted on) Kim; (substituted off) 73' Helguson (substituted on) Gestede; (yellow card) 83' Turner; 90+2' Noone; 90+5' Gunnarsson	Stadium: The Valley; Attendance: 15,764; Referee: Keith Stroud

10 November 2012 16	Cardiff City	2–1	Hull City	Cardiff
15:00 GMT	Helguson 3'; McNaughton (substituted off) Kiss (substituted on) 19'; Kiss (substituted off) Ralls (substituted on) 46'; Kim (yellow card) 60'; Helguson (substituted off) Gestede (substituted on) 66'; Turner (yellow card) 71'; Hudson 82'		(substituted off) 56' Simpson (substituted on) Meyler; (substituted off) 56' McShane (substituted on) Brady; (substituted off) 75' Quinn (substituted on) McLean; 90' Koren	Stadium: Cardiff City Stadium; Attendance: 20,058; Referee: Iain Williamson

17 November 2012 17	Cardiff City	1–0	Middlesbrough	Cardiff
15:00 GMT	Turner (substituted off) Nugent (substituted on) 14'; Connolly 19'; Taylor (substituted off) Ralls (substituted on) 25'; Whittingham (yellow card) 55'; Gunnarsson (substituted off) Bellamy (substituted on) 61'		(yellow card) 4' Hines; (substituted off) 30' Haroun (substituted on) Smallwood; (yellow card) 56' Leadbitter; (substituted off) 60' Jutkiewicz (substituted on) Emnes; (substituted off) 71' Friend (substituted on) Bailey	Stadium: Cardiff City Stadium; Attendance: 21,578; Referee: Oliver Langford

24 November 2012 18	Barnsley	1–2	Cardiff City	Barnsley
15:00 GMT	Dawson (substituted off) Buzsáky (substituted on) 56'; Done (substituted off) Noble-Lazarus (substituted on) 56'; Mellis 75' (yellow card) 90+4'; Tudgay (substituted off) Sinclair (substituted on) 81'; Buzsáky (yellow card) 85'		22' Nugent; (yellow card) 26' (yellow-red card) 89' Lappin; 51' Gunnarsson; (substituted off) 60' Helguson (substituted on) Gestede; (substituted off) 70' Gunnarsson (substituted on) Mutch; (substituted off) 75' Mason (substituted on) Bellamy; (yellow card) 84' Mutch; (yellow card) 89' Marshall	Stadium: Oakwell; Attendance: 8,227; Referee: Dean Whitestone

27 November 2012 19	Derby County	1–1	Cardiff City	Derby
19:45 GMT	Roberts (substituted off) O'Connor (substituted on) 26'; Bryson (yellow card) 37'; O'Connor (yellow card) 55'; Jacobs (substituted off) Tyson (substituted on) 67'; Robinson 69'; Robinson (substituted off) Hendrick (substituted on) 81'		11' Helguson; (yellow card) 60' (yellow-red card) 63' Noone; (substituted off) 70' Bellamy (substituted on) Mutch; (substituted off) 73' Gunnarsson (substituted on) Conway; (substituted off) 79' Helguson (substituted on) Mason; (yellow card) 80' Mutch	Stadium: Pride Park Stadium; Attendance: 20,911; Referee: Mark Brown

2 December 2012 20	Cardiff City	1–0	Sheffield Wednesday	Cardiff
15:00 GMT	Mutch (yellow card) 49'; Kim (substituted off) Mason (substituted on) 59'; Helguson (substituted off) Gestede (substituted on) 70'; Mutch (substituted off) Gunnarsson (substituted on) 79'; Conway 80'		(substituted off) 33' Sidibe (substituted on) Madine; (yellow card) 48' Prutton; (yellow card) 59' Helan; (substituted off) 64' Mayor (substituted on) Johnson; (yellow card) 73' Taylor; (substituted off) 86' O'Grady (substituted on) Rodri	Stadium: Cardiff City Stadium; Attendance: 22,034; Referee: Graham Scott

7 December 2012 21	Blackburn Rovers	1–4	Cardiff City	Blackburn
19:45 GMT	Lowe (yellow card) 29'; Ms Olsson (substituted off) Kazim-Richards (substituted on) 46'; King 51'; Mn Olsson (yellow card) 68'; Formica (substituted off) Nunes (substituted on) 69'; Hanley (yellow card) 74'; Etuhu (substituted off) Rochina (substituted on) 81'		(yellow card) 17' (goal) 30' Hudson; 55' Bellamy; (yellow card) 65' Noone; (yellow card) 69' Helguson; (substituted off) 69' Noone (substituted on) Kim; (substituted off) 80' Bellamy (substituted on) Mason; 84' Mason; 85' Kim; (substituted off) 90+2' Helguson (substituted on) Gestede	Stadium: Ewood Park; Attendance: 12,460; Referee: Simon Hooper

15 December 2012 22	Cardiff City	1–2	Peterborough United	Cardiff
15:00 GMT	Connolly (yellow card) 20'; Helguson (yellow card) 21'; Cowie (yellow card) 44'; McNaughton (substituted off) Gunnarsson (substituted on) 51'; Cowie (substituted off) Mutch (substituted on) 52'; Conway (substituted off) Gestede (substituted on) 64'; Gestede 89'; Turner (yellow card) 90'		(yellow card) 5' (goal) 22' Bostwick; (yellow card) 45+1' Knight-Percival; 47' Gayle; (yellow card) 55' Zakuani; (substituted off) 68' Knight-Percival (substituted on) Alcock; (substituted off) 82' Newell (substituted on) Ferdinand; (substituted off) 82' Rowe (substituted on) Brisley; (yellow card) 90' Tomlin	Stadium: Cardiff City Stadium; Attendance: 26,073; Referee: David Coote

22 December 2012 23	Leicester City	0–1	Cardiff City	Leicester
15:00 GMT	Vardy (substituted off) Waghorn (substituted on) 50'; Knockaert (substituted off) Marshall (substituted on) 68'; Dyer (substituted off) Lingard (substituted on) 68'	Report	25' Bellamy; (yellow card) 38' Turner; (substituted off) 51' Helguson (substituted on) Gestede; (substituted off) 55' Kim (substituted on) Cowie; (yellow card) 61' Connolly; (substituted off) 76' Mutch (substituted on) Gunnarsson; (yellow card) 79' Whittingham	Stadium: King Power Stadium; Attendance: 25,055; Referee: Graham Salisbury

26 December 2012 24	Cardiff City	2–1	Crystal Palace	Cardiff
15:00 GMT	Hudson (yellow card) 10'; Noone 44' (yellow card) 60'; Mutch (substituted off) Gunnarsson (substituted on) 46'; Helguson (substituted off) Gestede (substituted on) 57'; Gunnarsson 73'; Noone (substituted off) Mason (substituted on) 76'; Mason (yellow card) 90+1'	Report	4' Jedinak; (yellow card) 34'Zaha; (yellow card) 41'Bolasie; (substituted off) 74' Bolasie (substituted on) Moritz; (yellow card) 76' Parr; (yellow card) 82' Dikgacoi; (substituted off) 87' Parr (substituted on) Easter	Stadium: Cardiff City Stadium; Attendance: 26,098; Referee: Phill Gibbs

29 December 2012 25	Cardiff City	1–0	Millwall	Cardiff
15:00 GMT	Gestede 8'; Conway (yellow card) 38'; Gunnarsson (substituted off) Mutch (substituted on) 45+3'; Noone (substituted off) Cowie (substituted on) 73'; Gestede (substituted off) Helguson (substituted on) 77'	Report	(substituted off) 18' Malone (substituted on) Feeney; (substituted off) 64' N'Guessan (substituted on) Batt	Stadium: Cardiff City Stadium; Attendance: 24,263; Referee: Mark Halsey

1 January 2013 26	Birmingham City	0–1	Cardiff City	Birmingham
15:00 GMT	Reilly (substituted off) Gomis (substituted on) 32'; Robinson (yellow card) 51'; Elliott (substituted off) Jervis (substituted on) 70'; Packwood (substituted off) Hancox (substituted on) 77'; Jervis (yellow card) 84'; Gomis (yellow card) 87'	Report	41' Mason; (substituted off) 51' Mutch (substituted on) Cowie; (substituted off) 61' Kim (substituted on) Noone; (substituted off) 70' Mason (substituted on) Gestede	Stadium: St Andrew's; Attendance: 17,493; Referee: Robert Madley

12 January 2013 27	Cardiff City	0–0	Ipswich Town	Cardiff
15:00 GMT	Gestede (substituted off) Mason (substituted on) 46'; Noone (substituted off) Smith (substituted on) 68'; Conway (substituted off) Helguson (substituted on) 86'	Report	(substituted off) 60' McLean (substituted on) Chopra; (substituted off) 64' McGoldrick (substituted on) Murphy; (yellow card) 78' Hyam; (substituted off) 80' Martin (substituted on) Nouble; (yellow card) 90+1' Orr	Stadium: Cardiff City Stadium; Attendance: 22,724; Referee: Scott Mathieson

19 January 2013 28	Blackpool	1–2	Cardiff City	Blackpool
15:00 GMT	Taylor-Fletcher 60'; Gomes (substituted off) Phillips (substituted on) 61'; Osbourne (substituted off) Martínez (substituted on) 76'	Report	(substituted off) 48' Hudson (substituted on) Nugent; (yellow card) 52' Gunnarsson; 54' Kim; 64' Smith; (substituted off) 65' Smith (substituted on) Helguson; (substituted off) 76' Kim (substituted on) Cowie; (yellow card) 89' Whittingham; (yellow card) 90+3' Helguson	Stadium: Bloomfield Road; Attendance: 13,998; Referee: Michael Naylor

26 January 2013	Cardiff City	P–P	Leicester City	Cardiff
15:00 GMT				Stadium: Cardiff City Stadium

2 February 2013 29	Leeds United	0–1	Cardiff City	Leeds
15:00 GMT	Austin (yellow card) 14'; Diouf (substituted off) Habibou (substituted on) 72'	Report	(yellow card) 23' Marshall; (yellow card) 23' Bellamy; (substituted off) 61' Kim (substituted on) Campbell; 64' Campbell; (yellow card) 78' Hudson; (substituted off) 78' Conway (substituted on) Helguson	Stadium: Elland Road; Attendance: 19,236; Referee: Mike Dean

9 February 2013 30	Huddersfield Town	0–0	Cardiff City	Huddersfield
15:00 GMT	Lynch (yellow card) 45+2'; Norwood (substituted off) Atkinson (substituted on) 84'; Hunt (yellow card) 88'; Lee (substituted off) Vaughan (substituted on) 90+1'	Report	(yellow card) 25' Taylor; (substituted off) 46' Kim (substituted on) Helguson; (substituted off) 46' McNaughton (substituted on) Nugent; (yellow card) 57' Nugent; (substituted off) Smith (substituted on) Campbell; (yellow card) 89' Bellamy	Stadium: Galpharm Stadium; Attendance: 15,265; Referee: Mark Brown

16 February 2013 31	Cardiff City	2–1	Bristol City	Cardiff
13:00 GMT	Campbell 45+1', 58'; Smith (substituted off) Cowie (substituted on) 64'; Campbell (substituted off) Helguson (substituted on) 72'; Noone (substituted off) Kim (substituted on) 84'	Report	(yellow card) 48' Fontaine; (substituted off) 64' Anderson (substituted on) Adomah; (substituted off) 80' Pearson (substituted on) Howard; (substituted off) 80' Kelly (substituted on) Kilkenny; 90+2' (o.g.) Nugent	Stadium: Cardiff City Stadium; Attendance: 25,586; Referee: Eddie Ilderton

19 February 2013 32	Cardiff City	0–2	Brighton & Hove Albion	Cardiff
19:45 GMT	Hudson (yellow card) 27'; Noone (substituted off) Conway (substituted on) 53'; Campbell (substituted off) Helguson (substituted on) 84'	Report	(yellow card) 23' El-Abd; 43' Orlandi; (yellow card) 50' Bridcutt; (substituted off) 70' Orlandi (substituted on) Dicker; (substituted off) 75' Hammond (substituted on) Calderón; (yellow card) 90+1' Bruno; 90+4' Ulloa; (substituted off) 90+6' Buckley (substituted on) Forster-Caskey	Stadium: Cardiff City Stadium; Attendance: 23,782; Referee: Keith Stroud

24 February 2013 33	Wolverhampton Wanderers	1–2	Cardiff City	Wolverhampton
14:00 GMT	Doherty (yellow card) 25'; Doumbia (substituted off) Doyle (substituted on) 46'; Batth (substituted off) Ebanks-Blake (substituted on) 46'; Sako 70'; Doherty (substituted off) Foley (substituted on) 78'		20', 67' Campbell; (yellow card) 55' Whittingham; (substituted off) 75' Hudson (substituted on) McNaughton; (substituted off) 80' Cowie (substituted on) Kim; (substituted off) 82' Campbell (substituted on) Helguson	Stadium: Molineux Stadium; Attendance: 20,930; Referee: Stuart Attwell

2 March 2013 34	Middlesbrough	2–1	Cardiff City	Middlesbrough
15:00 GMT	Dyer 13'; Sammy Ameobi 17'; Eachran (yellow card) 35'; Ameobi (substituted off) Ledesma (substituted on) 73'; Dyer (substituted off) Emns (substituted on) 73'; Miller (substituted off) Main (substituted on) 87'; McDonald (yellow card) 90+3'		(substituted off) 46' McNaughton (substituted on) Nugent; (yellow card) 55' (goal) 67' Gunnarsson; (yellow card) 57' Nugent; (substituted off) 57' Smith (substituted on) Helguson; (substituted off) 73' Bellamy (substituted on) Noone; (yellow card) 90' Marshall	Stadium: Riverside Stadium; Attendance: 15,440; Referee: Mark Haywood

5 March 2013 35	Cardiff City	1–1	Derby County	Cardiff
19:45 GMT	Gunnarsson (yellow card) 19'; Smith (yellow card) 59'; Smith (substituted off) Noone (substituted on) 71'; Helguson (substituted off) Mason (substituted on) 76'; Noone 82'; Conway (substituted off) Gestede (substituted on) 84'	Report	(yellow card) 13' Gjokaj; (yellow card) 51' Coutts; (substituted off) 71' Forsyth (substituted on) Jacobs; 75' Sammon	Stadium: Cardiff City Stadium; Attendance: 21,544; Referee: Darren Deadman

9 March 2013	Cardiff City	P–P	Barnsley	Cardiff
15:00 GMT				Stadium: Cardiff City Stadium

12 March 2013 36	Cardiff City	1–1	Leicester City	Cardiff
19:45 GMT	Noone (yellow card) 27'; Hudson (substituted off) McNaughton (substituted on) 46'; Noone (substituted off) Bellamy (substituted on) 46'; Nugent (substituted off) 66'; Conway (substituted off) Gestede (substituted on) 70'; Gestede 90+3'	Report	(yellow card) 11' Nugent; (yellow card) 20' St Ledger; (substituted off) 63' Wellens (substituted on) Kane; 72' (yellow card) 80' M Keane; (substituted off) 80' Nugent (substituted on) Vardy; (substituted off) 88' Wood (substituted on) Waghorn	Stadium: Cardiff City Stadium; Attendance: 23,231; Referee: Nigel Miller

16 March 2013 37	Sheffield Wednesday	0–2	Cardiff City	Sheffield
15:00 GMT	Prutton (yellow card) 37'; Gardner (yellow card) 43'; Pugh (substituted off) Madine (substituted on) 56'; Helan (substituted off) Johnson (substituted on) 68'; Antonio (substituted off) Maguire (substituted on) 77'; Johnson (yellow card) 90+3'	Report	45' Cowie; 65' Connolly; (yellow card) 78' Bellamy; (substituted off) 81' Bellamy (substituted on) Smith; (yellow card) 86' Helguson; (substituted off) 87' Helguson (substituted on) Gestede	Stadium: Hillsborough Stadium; Attendance: 24,191; Referee: James Linington

30 March 2013 38	Peterborough United	2–1	Cardiff City	Peterborough
15:00 GMT	McCann 72' (pen.), 79' (pen.)	Report	23' Gunnarsson; (yellow card) 41' Turner; (yellow card) 43' Cowie	Stadium: London Road Stadium; Attendance: 9,236; Referee: Eddie Ilderton

1 April 2013 39	Cardiff City	3–0	Blackburn Rovers	Cardiff
19:45 BST	Campbell 40'; Campbell (substituted off) Mason (substituted on) 58'; Mutch (substituted off) Whittingham (substituted on) 81'; Mason 86'; Bellamy (substituted off) Gestede (substituted on) 88'; Whittingham 90+6'	Report	(yellow card) 33' Best; (yellow card) 40' Kean; (substituted off) 47' Kean (substituted on) Sandomierski; (substituted off) 62' Bentley (substituted on) Dunn; (substituted off) 74' Murphy (substituted on) Rhodes; (yellow card) 79' Kazim-Richards; (yellow card) 90+5' Dunn	Stadium: Cardiff City Stadium; Attendance: 24,327; Referee: Craig Pawson

6 April 2013 40	Watford	0–0	Cardiff City	Watford
15:00 BST	Battocchio (substituted off) Hogg (substituted on) 51'; Vydra (substituted off) Forestieri (substituted on) 60'; Cassetti (yellow card) 76'	Report	(substituted off) 10' Connolly (substituted on) McNaughton; (substituted off) 56' Mason (substituted on) Gestede; (yellow card) 68' Gunnarsson; (substituted off) 69' Conway (substituted on) Smith; (yellow card) 85' Mutch	Stadium: Vicarage Road; Attendance: 15,550; Referee: Mark Halsey

9 April 2013 41	Cardiff City	1–1	Barnsley	Cardiff
19:45 GMT	Mason (substituted off) Helguson (substituted off) 58'; Turner 59'; Gunarsson (yellow card); Kim (substituted off) Whittingham (substituted on) 68'; Smith (substituted off) Conway; Barnet (yellow card) 90'	Report	(yellow card) 59' O'Grady; (substituted off) 61' O'Brien (substituted on) Cywka; (substituted off) 67' Harewood (substituted on) Scotland; (substituted off) 70' Mellis (substituted on) Dagnall; 90' Foster	Stadium: Cardiff City Stadium; Attendance: 22,584; Referee: Fred Graham

13 April 2013 42	Cardiff City	3–0	Nottingham Forest	Cardiff
15:00 BST	Helguson 26'; Mutch (yellow card) 45+2'; Helguson (substituted off) Gestede (substituted on) 46'; Gestede 60', 66'; Smith (substituted off) Noone (substituted on) 74'; Mutch (substituted off) Whittingham (substituted on) 85'		(yellow card) 25' Halford; (yellow card) 36' Jara; (red card) 42' Henderson; (substituted off) 46' Majewski (substituted on) Tudgay; (substituted off) 46' Halford (substituted on) Collins; (yellow card) 59' Blackstock; (yellow card) 59' Guedioura; (substituted off) 74' Guedioura (substituted on) Moussi; (yellow card) 85' Moussi	Stadium: Cardiff City Stadium; Attendance: 26,588; Referee: Andre Marriner

16 April 2013 43	Cardiff City	0–0	Charlton Athletic	Cardiff
19:45 BST	Noone (substituted off) Smith (substituted on) 71'		(yellow card) 62' Fuller; (substituted off) 81' Hughes (substituted on) Gower; (substituted off) 81' Fuller (substituted on) Obika; (substituted off) 88' Pritchard (substituted on) Green	Stadium: Cardiff City Stadium; Attendance: 26,338; Referee: Scott Mathieson

20 April 2013 44	Burnley	1–1	Cardiff City	Burnley
15:00 BST	Trippier (yellow card) 39'; Wallace (substituted off) Paterson (substituted on) 46'; Stanislas (substituted off) Edgar (substituted on) 46'; Marney (yellow card) 76'; Marney (substituted off) Treacy (substituted on) 82'; Edgar 90+1'		27' Conway; (substituted off) 66' Noone (substituted on) Bellamy; (substituted off) 74' Mutch (substituted on) Cowie; (yellow card) 82' Kim	Stadium: Turf Moor; Attendance: 13,264; Referee: Stuart Attwell

27 April 2013 45	Cardiff City	1–1	Bolton Wanderers	Cardiff
15:00 BST	Conway (substituted off) Noone (substituted on) 59'; Mutch (substituted off) Smith (substituted on) 62'; Noone 68'; McNaughton (substituted off) Nugent (substituted on) 82'		(yellow card) 11' Knight; 18' Eagles; (substituted off) 64' Sordell (substituted on) Davies; (yellow card) 76' Ricketts; (yellow card) 82' Alonso; (substituted off) 90+1' Vela (substituted on) Holden	Stadium: Cardiff City Stadium; Attendance: 26,418; Referee: Richard Naylor

4 May 2013 46	Hull City	2–2	Cardiff City	Kingston upon Hull
15:00 BST	Elmohamady (yellow card) 41'; Simpson (substituted off) Proschwitz (substituted on) 45'; Proschwitz 58' (yellow card) 90+1'; McShane 63'; Brady (substituted off) Fathi (substituted on) 88'	Report	(yellow card) 30' (yellow-red card) 90' Taylor; (substituted off) 46' Velikonja (substituted on) Campbell; 49' Campbell; (substituted off) 64' Kim (substituted on) Gestede; (yellow card) 79' Nugent; (substituted off) 84' Noone (substituted on) Maynard; (yellow card) 90+3' Gunnarsson; 90+5' Maynard	Stadium: KC Stadium; Attendance: 23,812; Referee: Keith Stroud

=== FA Cup ===
5 January R3	Macclesfield Town	2–1	Cardiff City	Macclesfield
15:00 GMT	Murtagh (yellow card) 15'; Mackreth (substituted off) Henry (substituted on) 61'; Martin (substituted off) Winn (substituted on) 66'; Morgan-Smith (substituted off) Fairhurst (substituted on) 71'; Barnes-Homer 85', 88' (pen.)	Report	(yellow card) 54' McNaughton; 57' Jarvis; (substituted off) 57' McNaughton (substituted on) Coulson; (substituted off) 64' Harris (substituted on) O'Sullivan; (substituted off) 72' Kiss (substituted on) Wharton	Stadium: Moss Rose; Attendance: 3,165; Referee: Andrew Madley

=== League Cup ===
14 August R1	Northampton Town	2–1	Cardiff City	Northampton
19:45 BST	Artell (yellow card) 4'; Artell 37'; Nicholls 48'; Hackett (substituted off) Mukendi (substituted on) 56'; Guttridge (yellow card) 69'; Platt (substituted off) Akinfenwa (substituted on) 71'; Akinfenwa (yellow card) 86'	Report	4' (pen.) Helguson; (yellow card) 17' Sainte-Luce; (substituted off) 19' McPhail (substituted on) O'Sullivan; (substituted off) 51' Mason (substituted on) Mutch; (substituted off) 61' Helguson (substituted on) Jarvis; (yellow card) 75' Oshilaja	Stadium: Sixfields Stadium; Attendance: 2,819; Referee: David Phillips

== Overall summary ==
=== Summary ===
Games played	48 (46 Championship, 1 FA Cup, 1 League Cup)
Games won	25 (25 Championship, 0 FA Cup, 0 League Cup)
Games drawn	12 (12 Championship, 0 FA Cup, 0 League Cup)
Games lost	11 (9 Championship, 1 FA Cup, 1 League Cup)
Goals scored	74 (72 Championship, 1 FA Cup, 1 League Cup)
Goals conceded	49 (45 Championship, 2 FA Cup, 2 League Cup)
Goal difference	+27
Clean sheets	18 (18 Championship, 0 FA Cup, 0 League Cup)
Yellow cards	75 (72 Championship, 1 FA Cup, 2 League Cup)
Red cards	3 (3 Championship, 0 FA Cup, 0 League Cup)
Worst discipline	Mark Hudson (8 (yellow card) , 0 (red card) )
Best result	4–0 vs Burnley (H)
Worst result	2–4 vs Bristol C (A) & 1–3 vs Nottm Forest (A)
Most appearances	David Marshall (46)
Top scorer	Heiðar Helguson (9 goals)
Points	87

=== Score overview ===
Opposition	Home score	Away score	Double
Barnsley	1–1	2–1	No
Birmingham City	2–1	1–0	Yes
Blackburn Rovers	3–0	4–1	Yes
Blackpool	3–0	2–1	Yes
Bolton Wanderers	1–1	1–2	No
Brighton & Hove Albion	0–2	0–0	No
Bristol City	2–1	2–4	No
Burnley	4–0	1–1	No
Charlton Athletic	0–0	4–5	No
Crystal Palace	2–1	2–3	No
Derby County	1–1	1–1	No
Huddersfield Town	1–0	0–0	No
Hull City	2–1	2–2	No
Ipswich Town	0–0	2–1	No
Leeds United	2–1	1–0	Yes
Leicester City	1–1	1–0	No
Middlesbrough	1–0	1–2	No
Millwall	1–0	2–0	Yes
Nottingham Forest	3–0	1–3	No
Peterborough United	1–2	1–2	No
Sheffield Wednesday	1–0	2–0	Yes
Watford	2–1	0–0	No
Wolverhampton Wanderers	3–1	2–1	Yes

== Under-21s ==
=== Friendlies ===
Match	Date	Opponent	Venue	Result	Cardiff City Scorers	Opposition Scorers	Report
1	8 August	Barry Town	A	2–1	Keinan, Sainte-Luce	Bell	Report

=== Under 21 Premier League Group 2 ===
Match	Date	Opponent	Venue	Result	Cardiff City Scorers	Opposition Scorers	Report
1	20 August	Brighton & Hove Albion	H	2–1	Jesse Darko (37), Gethyn Hill (88)	George Barker (90)	Report
2	3 September	Queens Park Rangers	H	1–4	Dekel Keinan (2)	Rob Hulse (33, 53), Taylor Parmenter (39), Mo Sharif (51)	Report
3	7 September	Ipswich Town	A	0–6		Bilel Moshni (x2), Kyle Hammond, David October, Mark Timlin, Jack Marriott	Report
4	24 September	Charlton Athletic	H	2–0	Craig Conway (59), Declan John (64)		Report
5	1 October	Brentford	A	1–2	Tommy O'Sullivan (90)	Leon Redwood (24), Lee Norris (63)	Report
6	30 October	Millwall	H	4–0	Etien Velikonja (45, 63, 77), Nathaniel Jarvis (73)		Report
7	5 November	Brighton & Hove Albion	A	0–1		George Barker	Report
8	13 November	Swansea City	H	2–1	Craig Conway (60), Jesse Darko (76)	Danny Graham (81)	Report
9	20 November	Colchester United	H	4–0	Etien Velikonja (14,27), Jordon Mutch (28), Filip Kiss (42)		Report
10	3 December	Queens Park Rangers	A	1–2	Luke Coulson (83)	Frankie Sutherland (31), Tom Hitchcock (59)	Report
11	14 January	Barnet	H	2–0	Filip Kiss, Etien Velikonja		Report
12	28 January	Brentford	H	2–1	Etien Velikonja (60), Joe Ralls (80)	Luke Norris (90)	Report
13	4 February	Bristol City	H	4–0	Etien Velikonja (17, 53, 58), Jordan Mutch (61)		Report
14	18 February	Charlton Athletic	A	0–4		Michael Smith (39, 74), Callum Harriott (68), Kevin Feely (88)	Report
15	26 February	Swansea City	A	2–1	Jordon Mutch (48), Rudy Gestede (69)	Josh Sheehan (86)	Report
16	12 March	Millwall	A	2–1	Etien Velikonja (2), Luke Coulson (74)	Fred Onyedinma (77)	Report
17	18 March	Colchester United	A	3–1	Rhys Healey (25, 66), Filip Kiss (43)	Drey Wright (5)	Report
18	25 March	Ipswich Town	H	3–1	Etien Velikonja (8), Rhys Healey (21), Filip Kiss (38)	Jack Marriott (43)	Report
19	3 April	Bristol City	A	3–2	Rhys Healey (1), Filip Kiss (33), Declan John (68)	Kevin Krans (6, 45)	Report
20	10 April	Barnet	A	3–1	Rhys Healey (59), Kadeem Harris (68), Etien Velikonja (82)	A Robertson (5)	Report

== Honours ==
Team

- Football League Championship champions

Individual

- February Player of the Month – Fraizer Campbell
- Championship Team of the Year – Mark Hudson & Peter Whittingham
- LMA Championship Manager of the Year – Malky Mackay

Club Awards

- Player of the Year – Mark Hudson

Club

- Family Club of the Year

Team of the Week
Date	Player(s)
3 September	Peter Whittingham
17 September	Peter Whittingham
1 October	Andrew Taylor
1 October	Matthew Connolly
1 October	Peter Whittingham
8 October	Heidar Helguson
29 October	Craig Noone
19 November	Matthew Connolly

== Club staff ==
=== Backroom staff ===
Position	Name
First-team manager	Malky Mackay
Assistant manager	David Kerslake
First-team coach	Joe McBride
Goalkeeping coach	James Hollman
Head of Performance	Richard Collinge
Senior Physiotherapist	Sean Connelly
Assistant physiotherapist	Adam Rattenberry
Sports scientist	Nilton Terroso
Club doctor	Len Nokes
Head of recruitment	Ian Moody
Chief Scout	Mark Stow
Opposition Analyst	Martin Hodge
Performance analyst	Enda Barron
Kit & equipment manager	Ian Lenning

=== Board of directors ===
Position	Name
Chairman	(Malaysia) Simon Lim
Chief Executive	(Malaysia) Simon Lim
Finance Director	(Wales) Richard Thompson
Non-Executive; Board Members; Football Club	(Wales) Steve Borley (Malaysia) Derek Chee Seng Chin (England) Paul Guy (Malaysia) Len Wing Kong (Malaysia) Meng Kwong Lim (Wales) Michael Isaac (Malaysia) Vincent Lye Ek Seang
Non-Executive; Board Members; Cardiff City (Holdings)	(Cyprus) Mehmet Dalman; Danni Rais
