= Ben Turner (footballer) =

English footballer (born 1988)

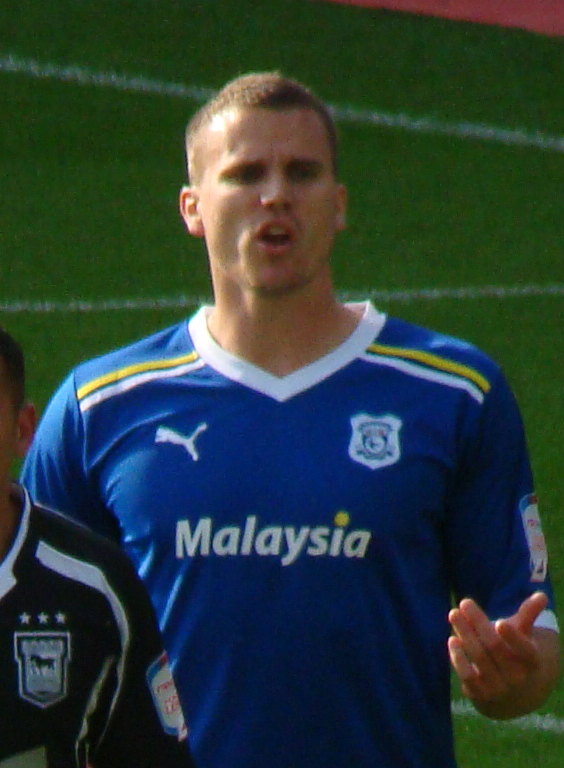
- Turner playing for Cardiff City in 2011

Personal information
- Full name: Ben Howard Turner
- Date of birth: 21 January 1988 (age 38)
- Place of birth: Birmingham, England
- Height: 6 ft 4 in (1.93 m)
- Position: Defender

Youth career
- 2004–2005: Coventry City

Senior career*
Years	Team	Apps	(Gls)
2005–2011	Coventry City	72	(4)
2006	→ Peterborough United (loan)	8	(0)
2007	→ Oldham Athletic (loan)	1	(0)
2011–2016	Cardiff City	111	(3)
2015	→ Coventry City (loan)	5	(1)
2016–2019	Burton Albion	88	(3)
2019	Mansfield Town	8	(0)
2019–2021	Notts County	39	(1)
2021–2022	Buxton	14	(0)
2022	Ilkeston Town	1	(0)
Total		347	(12)

International career
2007	England U19	1	(0)

Managerial career
- 2022: Ilkeston Town (Assistant Manager)
- 2022-2023: Forest Green Rovers (First Team Coach)
- 2023-2024: Woking Football Club (Assistant Manager)
- * Club domestic league appearances and goals as of 11:48, 25 October 2022 (UTC)

Ben Howard Turner (born 21 January 1988) is an English former professional footballer who played as a defender. He was formerly the Assistant Manager of Woking Football Club.

== Career ==
=== Early career ===
Born in Birmingham, West Midlands, at 5 years old Turner joined local youth side Sporting Boys in the Central Warwickshire league where he stayed until he joined the Coventry City FC academy ranks at the age of 11 years. Turner made his competitive debut on 22 August 2006 at the age of 18 years against Stoke City.

On 14 September 2006, Turner signed for Peterborough United on a month loan. He made his debut in a 1–0 win over Swindon Town two days later. Turner made his six more appearances before having his loan deal extended by another month. He returned to Coventry in December, after playing another four games for the Posh.

=== Coventry City ===
Turner started two FA Cup games after returning against Bristol City. On 23 February 2007, he joined League One side Oldham Athletic on loan. He made his debut the following day, where he received his first red card of his career against AFC Bournemouth. He started his third game for the Sky Blues in a 1–0 defeat to West Bromwich Albion, where he received a first half red card, upon returning to Coventry. Manager Iain Dowie tried to appeal the sending off but the appeal failed and received a four match ban meaning he would miss the final game against Burnley and the first three games of the following season. At the end of the season, Turner signed a new two-year contract keeping him at the club till the summer of 2009.

At the start of the season, Turner missed the first three league games due to his suspension. But started in wins against Carlisle United and Premier League champions Manchester United in the League Cup. His first league game of the season came in a 1–1 draw against Charlton Athletic, he continued to break into the first team throughout the season.

The following season, Turner was mainly used as injury cover for the Sky Blues defence under new manager Chris Coleman. However, in January 2009, he signed a new contract, committing him to the club till the end of the 2009–10 season.

Turner scored his first competitive goal, on 21 August 2010 against Derby County, four years after making his debut, the goal meant that Coventry won the fixture 2–1. He then scored two consecutive goals against Swansea City and Bristol City. He suffered a knee injury on 6 November from blocking a shot. On 23 December, Turner agreed a new three-and-a-half-year deal to stay at the Ricoh Arena till 2014. Turner never played for the rest of the season because of his knee injury.

Despite being ruled out until mid-September 2011, Turner managed to attract interest from Championship clubs such as Birmingham City and Cardiff City. On 29 August, Turner was in talks with Cardiff City over a possible move thought to be in a region of £750,000 and could see striker Jon Parkin going the other way.

=== Cardiff City ===
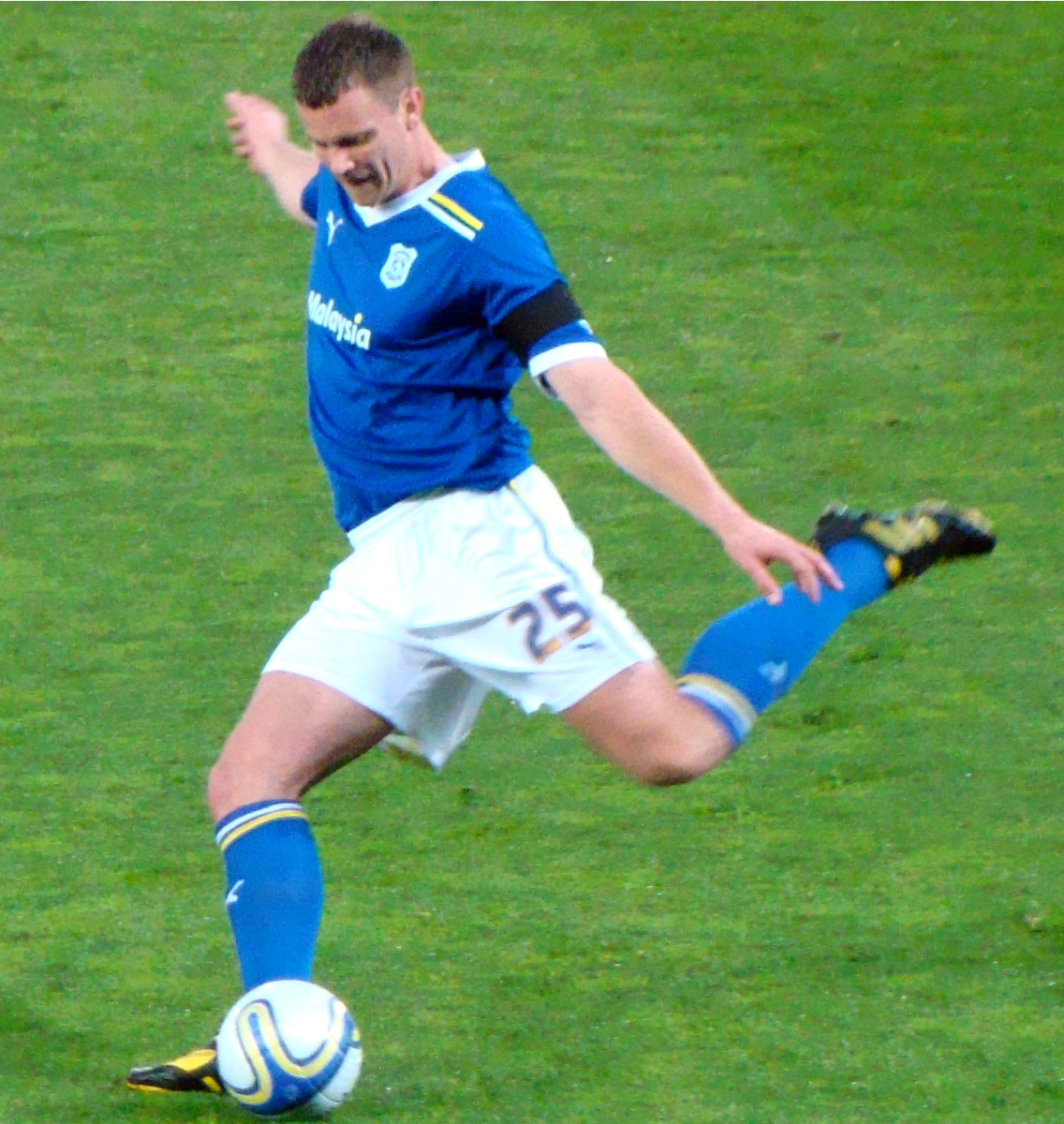
Turner playing for Cardiff City in 2012

On 30 August, Turner passed a medical and agreed a three-year deal with Cardiff City. The move was finalised the following day where he signed for an undisclosed fee, reported to be £750,000. Turner's knee injury, suffered the previous season, kept him out for the first few games following his move, though he made an appearance for the Development Squad against Southampton on 13 September, an encounter which ended in a 1–0 defeat for the Bluebirds. Turner's first involvement with Cardiff's first team was as an unused substitute against Southampton in the Championship on 28 September. His debut came on 1 October 2011, coming as an 84th-minute substitute against Hull City. His first start came two weeks later in 2–2 against Ipswich Town. He made his 100th career appearance on 30 October, against Leeds United. Turner's first goal for Cardiff came on 17 December 2011, in a 3–2 defeat to Middlesbrough. His 100th league appearance came on 31 January, in 1–1 draw with Southampton.

Turner scored a dramatic equaliser against Liverpool at Wembley Stadium in the League Cup final, in a performance lauded for the way City held their own against the Premier League giants. Cardiff were ultimately beaten 3–2 on penalties. He scored his third goal against Middlesbrough, this time at the Riverside Stadium and Cardiff won 2–0.

Turner started the 2012–13 season as first-choice centre-half alongside captain Mark Hudson. Sidelined with injury early on in the season, he was kept out of the team by new signing Matt Connolly upon his return. On 12 December, having regained his first-team berth, he signed a new contract keeping him at Cardiff until 2016. Turner was an integral part of the Cardiff side that won promotion from the Championship as League Champions.

Cardiff survived one season in the top flight and returned to the Championship. During the 2014–15 season, Turner suffered a serious injury which resulted in him missing the majority of the season. The following season, Turner's injury problems continued and following a comeback for Cardiff's development side, he joined former club, Coventry City on loan in November. Turner scored in his first appearance back at Ricoh Arena, however he suffered another ankle injury after 5 appearances and returned to Cardiff. At the end of the season, Turner was not offered a new contract by the club and was subsequently released, making his final appearance against Birmingham City.

=== Burton Albion ===
On 23 June 2016, it was announced that Turner would sign for Championship newcomers, Burton Albion.

=== Mansfield Town ===
Mansfield Town announced the signing of Turner on 2 February 2019, signing him on a free until the end of the season. In June 2019 he rejected a new contract with Mansfield.

=== Notts County ===
On 31 July 2019, Turner signed for Notts County.

=== Non-League ===
For the 2021–22 season he dropped into the Northern Premier League Premier Division, where he was a part of the Buxton side that finished Champions.

On 27 May 2022, he signed for newly promoted Northern Premier League Premier Division side Ilkeston Town managed by Martin Carruthers. Following the sacking of Carruthers, Turner was appointed assistant manager to interim manager Jamie Ward, being given the job on a permanent basis on 21 September 2022.

On 25 October 2022, following surgery on an ankle injury sustained earlier in the season, Turner confirmed his retirement from football.

== International career ==
He has been called up to the England under-19 squad, he was on the bench twice without playing, but then made his debut on 20 May 2007 against Czech Republic for a UEFA European U-19 Championship Tournament, but was later substituted for Liverpool's Jack Hobbs.

He is also eligible to play for Wales through his Welsh grandparents. However, Turner rejected the chance to play for Wales.

== Coaching career ==
On 10 November 2022, Turner left his assistant manager role at Ilkeston Town to join League One club Forest Green Rovers as a first-team coach.

On 27 January 2023, Turner left Forest Green Rovers along with assistant manager Michael Doyle after the club parted company with Ian Burchnall on 26 January 2023.

On 17 December 2023, Turner was appointed Woking FC's Assistant Manager, reuniting with Michael Doyle, their First Team Coach. On 14 December 2024, he departed the club alongside Doyle.

== Career statistics ==
As of match played 9 May 2016

Club	Season	League			FA Cup		League Cup		Other^{[A]}		Total	
Club	Season	Division	Apps	Goals	Apps	Goals	Apps	Goals	Apps	Goals	Apps	Goals
Coventry City	2005–06	Championship	1	0	0	0	0	0	0	0	1	0
Coventry City	2006–07	Championship	1	0	2	0	0	0	0	0	3	0
Coventry City	2007–08	Championship	19	0	1	0	3	0	0	0	23	0
Coventry City	2008–09	Championship	24	0	4	0	1	0	0	0	29	0
Coventry City	2009–10	Championship	13	0	0	0	1	0	0	0	14	0
Coventry City	2010–11	Championship	14	4	0	0	0	0	0	0	14	4
Coventry City	Total		72	4	7	0	5	0	0	0	84	4
Peterborough United (loan)	2006–07	League Two	8	0	0	0	0	0	1	0	9	0
Oldham Athletic (loan)	2006–07	League One	1	0	0	0	0	0	0	0	1	0
Cardiff City	2011–12	Championship	37	2	0	0	4	1	2	0	43	3
Cardiff City	2012–13	Championship	31	1	0	0	0	0	0	0	31	1
Cardiff City	2013–14	Premier League	31	0	2	0	0	0	0	0	29	0
Cardiff City	2014–15	Championship	11	0	2	0	0	0	0	0	13	0
Cardiff City	2015–16	Championship	1	0	0	0	0	0	0	0	1	0
Cardiff City	Total		111	3	4	0	4	1	2	0	121	4
Coventry City (loan)	2015–16	League One	5	1	0	0	0	0	0	0	5	1
Burton Albion	2016–17	Championship	0	0	0	0	0	0	0	0	0	0
Career total			197	8	11	0	9	1	3	0	220	9

A. The "Other" column constitutes appearances and goals in the Football League Trophy and Football League play-offs.

== Honours ==
Cardiff City

- Football League Championship: 2012–13
- Football League Cup runner-up: 2011–12
