= Matthew Connolly =

English footballer (born 1987)

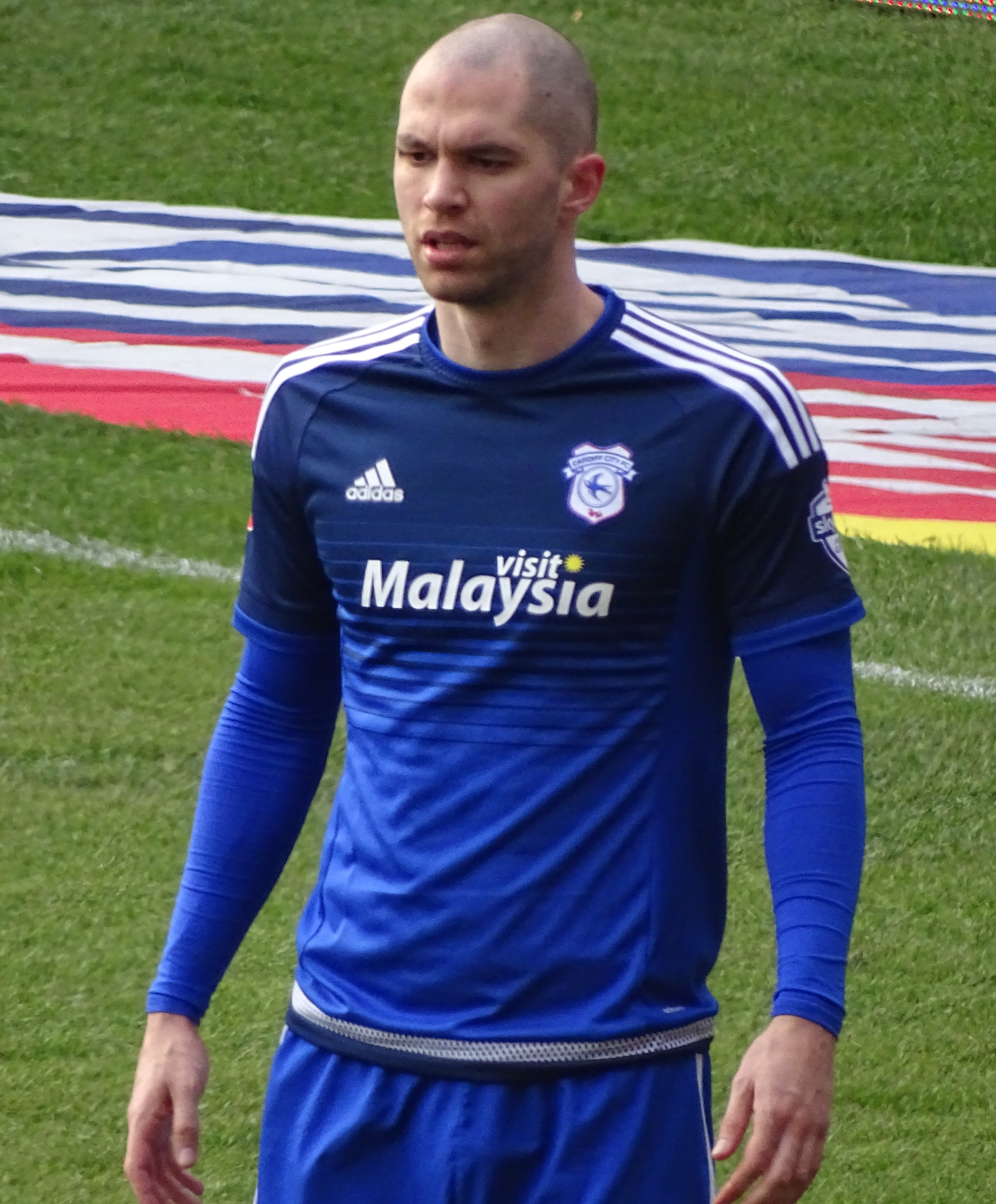
- Connolly playing for Cardiff City in 2016

Personal information
- Full name: Matthew Thomas Martin Connolly
- Date of birth: 24 September 1987 (age 39)
- Place of birth: Barnet, England
- Height: 6 ft 2 in (1.88 m)
- Position: Defender

Youth career
- 1997–2006: Arsenal

Senior career*
Years	Team	Apps	(Gls)
2006–2008	Arsenal	0	(0)
2006–2007	→ AFC Bournemouth (loan)	5	(1)
2007–2008	→ Colchester United (loan)	16	(2)
2008–2012	Queens Park Rangers	116	(2)
2012	→ Reading (loan)	6	(0)
2012–2020	Cardiff City	137	(7)
2015	→ Watford (loan)	6	(1)

International career
2006	England U19	3	(0)
- * Club domestic league appearances and goals as of 21:42, 6 March 2018 (UTC)

Matthew Thomas Martin Connolly (born 24 September 1987) is an English former professional footballer who played as a defender.

Having started his career at Arsenal, he moved to Queens Park Rangers, going on to win the Football League Championship in 2011. It would be the first of three titles in four years, as he won the same division again on loan at Reading in 2012 and Cardiff in 2013, which he had joined permanently one year earlier.

== Career ==
=== Arsenal ===
Born in Barnet, London, Connolly started his career as a youth at Arsenal, eventually making the reserve side. In September 2006 he was made captain of Arsenal's reserves. He made his first-team debut for Arsenal on 24 October 2006, starting a League Cup third round match against West Bromwich Albion.

On 23 November 2006, Arsenal announced that Connolly was going on loan to AFC Bournemouth until 2 January 2007. In total, he played seven games for Bournemouth (five in League One and two in the FA Cup), and scored his first goal at senior level in a 2–0 win over Nottingham Forest, on 5 December 2006. He returned to Arsenal as scheduled at the start of January 2007, and came on as a substitute for Armand Traoré against Liverpool in the League Cup Quarter-finals on 9 January.

On 9 July 2007, Arsenal announced that Connolly would be spending the whole of the 2007–08 season on loan to Colchester United, although he was eventually recalled midway through the loan on 2 January 2008.

=== Queens Park Rangers ===
The same day, his transfer to Queens Park Rangers was announced, after a lack of first-team opportunities were offered by Arsenal. His debut came on 5 January, in a 1–0 loss to Chelsea in the FA Cup. He scored his first goal for QPR against Blackpool on 16 January 2010. In the meantime, in November, he received his first call-up to the England U-21 squad, where he joined Arsenal teammate Theo Walcott. His second goal came on 6 March against West Bromwich Albion in a 3–1 win.

During the 2010–11 season, Connolly played a part in QPR's Championship title win playing 36 out of 43 games.

He joined Reading on a loan on 31 January 2012 until the end of the 2011–12 season. He made his debut on 11 February 2012 in a 2–0 win against Coventry City. He only played 6 times during Reading's promotion push which resulted in Reading winning the Championship title.

=== Cardiff City ===
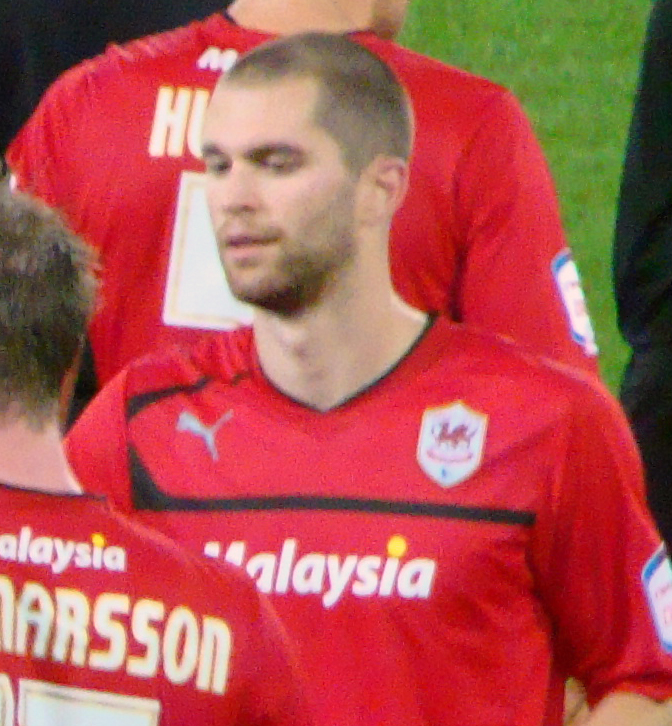
Connolly playing for Cardiff City in 2012

On 20 August 2012, QPR had accepted a £500,000 bid from Cardiff City for Connolly's services. On 22 August, the deal was completed and Connolly signed a contract that would keep him at the Cardiff City Stadium for 3 years. He made his debut in the Severnside derby against Bristol City on 25 August. He scored his first and second goal for the club in a 3–0 win over Blackpool on 29 September. His third goal came a month later against Burnley, and later scored his fourth against Middlesbrough. Making thirty-six appearances and scoring five goals, Connolly was a key figure as Cardiff won the Championship title, the third time in successive seasons that Connolly has achieved the feat.

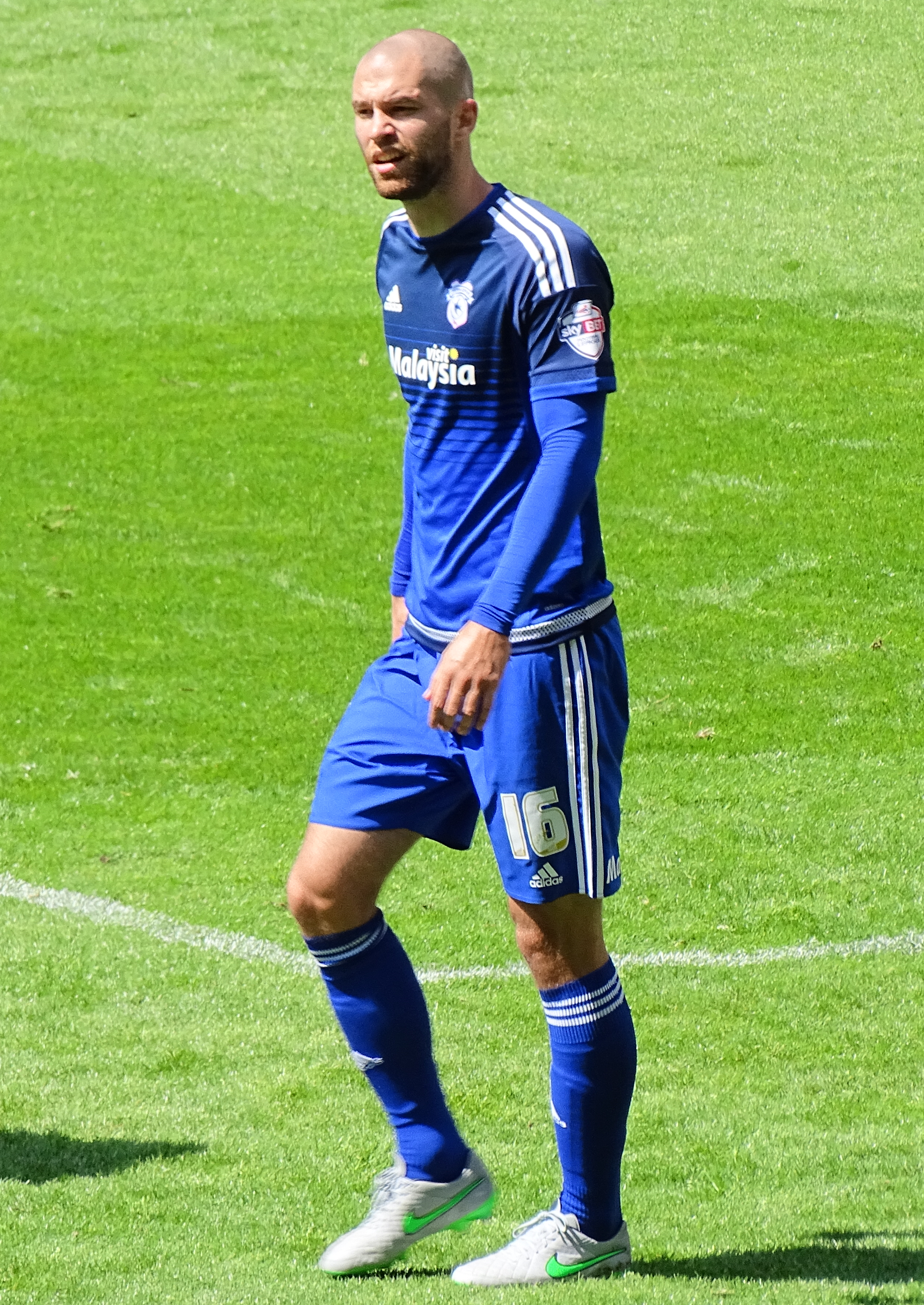
Connolly playing for Cardiff City in 2015.

He started the Premier League season playing at right back until new signing Kevin Theophile-Catherine became a permanent fixture in the side. Cardiff were relegated after just one season in the top flight. Connolly had then returned to the starting eleven partnering Mark Hudson in a 1–1 draw at Blackburn Rovers.

On 19 March 2015 Connolly joined another Championship side, Watford, on loan until the end of the 2014–15 season, despite having played 26 times for Cardiff that season. Manager Russell Slade stated the deal was a business rather than a footballing decision, with Connolly expressing his surprise at the move. Whilst at Watford, Connolly achieved the feat of being promoted to the Premier League for the fourth time with four clubs (QPR, Reading, Cardiff and Watford). At Watford, Connolly scored once; in a 3–1 win at Nottingham Forest.

Connolly rejoined the Cardiff squad for the 2015–16 season, earning himself a permanent place in the side alongside Sean Morrison. He had become of interest to other clubs during the January transfer window due to his impressive performances that season. These feats thus earned him a contract extension till 2019 and also the club's Player of the Year award. He was released by Cardiff at the end of the 2019–20 season.

== International career ==
Connolly made three appearances for the England under-19 side in 2006, playing in the 2006 UEFA European Under-19 Championship elite qualification matches.

== Personal life ==
Connolly attended Nicholas Breakspear School in St Albans.

== Career statistics ==
Appearances and goals by club, season and competition
Club	Season	League			FA Cup		League Cup		Continental		Other		Total	
Club	Season	Division	Apps	Goals	Apps	Goals	Apps	Goals	Apps	Goals	Apps	Goals	Apps	Goals
Arsenal	2006–07	Premier League	0	0	0	0	2	0	0	0	—		2	0
Arsenal	2007–08	Premier League	0	0	0	0	0	0	0	0	—		0	0
Arsenal	Total		0	0	0	0	2	0	0	0	—		2	0
Bournemouth (loan)	2006–07	League One	5	1	2	0	—		—		—		7	1
Colchester United (loan)	2007–08	Championship	16	2	—		0	0	—		—		16	2
Queens Park Rangers	2007–08	Championship	20	0	1	0	—		—		—		21	0
Queens Park Rangers	2008–09	Championship	35	0	0	0	4	0	—		—		39	0
Queens Park Rangers	2009–10	Championship	19	2	0	0	2	0	—		—		21	2
Queens Park Rangers	2010–11	Championship	36	0	0	0	1	0	—		—		37	0
Queens Park Rangers	2011–12	Premier League	6	0	0	0	1	0	—		—		7	0
Queens Park Rangers	Total		116	2	1	0	8	0	—		—		125	2
Reading (loan)	2011–12	Championship	6	0	—		—		—		—		6	0
Cardiff City	2012–13	Championship	36	5	0	0	0	0	—		—		36	5
Cardiff City	2013–14	Premier League	3	0	0	0	1	0	—		—		4	0
Cardiff City	2014–15	Championship	23	0	2	0	1	0	—		—		26	0
Cardiff City	2015–16	Championship	43	1	0	0	2	0	—		—		45	1
Cardiff City	2016–17	Championship	28	1	0	0	1	0	—		—		29	1
Cardiff City	2017–18	Championship	4	0	0	0	1	0	—		—		5	0
Cardiff City	2018–19	Premier League	0	0	0	0	1	0	—		—		1	0
Cardiff City	2019–20	Championship	0	0	0	0	0	0	—		0	0	0	0
Cardiff City	Total		137	7	2	0	7	0	—		0	0	146	2
Watford (loan)	2014–15	Championship	6	1	—		—		—		—		6	1
Career total			286	13	5	0	17	0	0	0	0	0	308	13

== Honours ==
Queens Park Rangers

- Football League Championship: 2010–11

Cardiff City

- Football League Championship: 2012–13

Watford

- Football League Championship runner-up: 2014–15

Individual

- Cardiff City Player of the Year: 2015–16
