= 2007–08 Birmingham City F.C. season =

Birmingham City F.C.
2007–08 season
- Chairman: David Gold
- Manager: Steve Bruce (to November 2007); Alex McLeish
- Ground: St Andrew's
- Premier League: 19th (relegated)
- FA Cup: Third round
- League Cup: Third round
- Top goalscorer: Mikael Forssell (9)
- Highest home attendance: 29,252 vs Liverpool, 26 April 2008
- Lowest home attendance: 10,185 vs Hereford United, League Cup 2nd round, 28 August 2007
- Average home league attendance: 26,181

The 2007–08 season was Birmingham City Football Club's 105th season in the English football league system since their admission to the Football League in 1892, their fifth season in the Premier League, and their 55th season in the top tier of English football. Birmingham finished 19th in the 20-team league, so were relegated back to the Championship after just one season at the higher level.

After Steve Bruce resigned as manager in November, Alex McLeish resigned his post as Scotland national team manager to take over.

== Pre-season ==
After successfully returning to the Premier League at the first attempt, manager Steve Bruce started to look to add depth to his team ahead of the new season. On loan midfielder Fabrice Muamba became the first player to join the Blues, as he moved from Arsenal to the second city for an undisclosed fee. June saw the arrivals of Stuart Parnaby who signed on a free transfer from Middlesbrough, Scottish striker Garry O'Connor who signed for £2.7 million from Lokomotiv Moscow, and French midfielder Olivier Kapo who was signed from Juventus for £3m. July saw even more players arrive at St Andrew's: midfielder Daniël de Ridder signed on a free transfer from Celta Vigo, Ghana goalkeeper Richard Kingson also on a free transfer, from Antalyaspor, and Brazilian defender Rafael Schmitz on loan from Lille.

The Blues were also ready to spend £3m on Tottenham Hotspur and Egypt midfielder Hossam Ghaly, but the deal was cancelled only days into his Blues career due to a training ground incident that resulted in Bruce sending him back to the London side before a work permit had been granted.

Four players were allowed to leave the club: defender Bruno Ngotty left on a free transfer to sign for Leicester City, midfielder Julian Gray also left on a free transfer for Coventry City, midfielder Stephen Clemence joined Leicester City for £1m, and striker DJ Campbell also joining Leicester City for £2.1m.

July also saw the Blues become the latest English club to be involved in a take over bid by a foreign millionaire. Hong Kong businessman Carson Yeung brought a 29.9% stake from the club's directors for a reported £15m. The Gold brothers (David and Ralph) and David Sullivan each sold 14.81% of the club's shares.

=== Pre-season friendlies ===
| Date | Opponents | Venue | Result | Score F–A | Scorers | Attendance | Report |
|---|---|---|---|---|---|---|---|
| 16 July 2007 | Hollenbach/Hohenlohe Auswahl | A | W | 2–0 | Forssell, Danns 87' pen. | 2,000 | |
| 18 July 2007 | 1. FC Heidenheim | A | W | 2–0 | Forssell 29' | | |
| 23 July 2007 | FC Schweinfurt 05 | A | W | 5–2 | Forssell (2) 10', 34' pen., McSheffrey 13', Jerome 42', 52' | | |
| 28 July 2007 | Walsall | A | W | 2–0 | Forssell 4', Jerome 33' | | |
| 31 July 2007 | Peterborough United | A | W | 3–0 | Kapo 50', Jerome, 54' Larsson 57' | | |
| 4 August 2007 | Sheffield Wednesday | A | W | 3–0 | Ridgewell 3', O'Connor 66' | 5,689 | |

== Season review ==
=== August ===
The new season started with a tough away trip to Stamford Bridge to play last season's runners-up Chelsea. But it was the Blues that struck first with former Chelsea forward Mikael Forssell scoring a header from a Gary McSheffrey free kick just 15 minutes in. Chelsea fought back: goals from Claudio Pizarro and Florent Malouda gave them a 2–1 lead before new signing Olivier Kapo struck an unstoppable shot past Petr Čech to leave the scores level at half time. The only goal of the second half, from Michael Essien, gave Chelsea all three points. The Blues' first home game of the season was against Sunderland who had beaten the Blues to the Championship title the previous season. An own goal from Paul McShane was enough to give the Blues the lead at half time, but Sunderland fought back with a goal from Michael Chopra before a Garry O'Connor goal seemed to have given Blues their first win of the season. However, a late Stern John goal was enough to earn Sunderland a point. West Ham United were the next team to visit St Andrew's, where a Mark Noble penalty was the only goal of the game that gave the London club all three points. The last league game of the month saw the side visit Pride Park where two Cameron Jerome goals were enough to defeat Derby who scored a goal of their own from Matt Oakley.

August also saw the close of the transfer window. Before the season had begun, Steve Bruce continued to strengthen his side with the signings of defender Franck Queudrue for £2m from Fulham, centre back Liam Ridgewell for £2m from local rivals Aston Villa, and Swiss defender Johan Djourou on loan from Arsenal. The final day of the transfer window also saw some activity as Spanish midfielder Borja Oubiña joined on loan from Celta Vigo and highly rated Honduras midfielder Wilson Palacios also joined on loan from Deportivo Olimpia.

=== September ===
On 1 September Birmingham travelled to the Riverside Stadium to take on Middlesbrough. Two first half goals from David Wheater and Stewart Downing were enough to see off the Blues, who rarely threatened the Middlesbrough goal. The next game saw Bolton Wanderers visit St Andrew's. A free kick from Queudrue was flicked on for Kapo to secure his second goal of the season, and more importantly, Blues' first three points at home. A difficult trip to Liverpool followed, where the Blues were able to secure a valuable point in a 0–0 draw. The downside to the game was a 13th-minute injury to Borja Oubiña that would see him injured until the end of the season. The final game of the month saw the side take on Manchester United. Although the Blues bossed large parts of the game, it was the Manchester side that finished with the points. Bad play from the Blues defence allowed Manchester United to score the only goal of the game from Cristiano Ronaldo.

=== October ===
Blues' first game in October saw them return to Ewood Park for the second time in eleven days. Goals from David Bentley and Benni McCarthy saw Blackburn take a two-goal lead, before Cameron Jerome struck to give the Blues a lifeline, but there was to be no comeback. It ended in a 2–1 win for Blackburn Rovers, leaving Birmingham 13th in the league table after nine games played. Thirteen days later a trip to Manchester City was next on the agenda for the Blues, where a 37th-minute goal from Elano saw the points stay in Manchester. The last game of the month was a crucial bottom of the table clash with Wigan Athletic at St Andrew's. A Marcus Bent goal in the 23rd minute was cancelled out three minutes later when Kapo scored from a penalty. After half time, Bent was able to recover Wigan's lead before they were pegged back again, this time by a goal scored by Birmingham defender Liam Ridgewell. The game could have gone either way before Kapo struck again, this time in the 81st minute leaving Wigan no chance to come back. It was Birmingham's third win of the season, and at the end of the month they were in 13th position with 11 points.

=== November ===
November started with an away game at Goodison Park against Everton. An early Yakubu goal was cancelled out in the 80th minute by Kapo, only for two injury-time goals from Lee Carsley and James Vaughan saw Everton snatch all three points. Next up was the Second City derby against Aston Villa at St Andrew's. An early Ridgewell own goal gave Villa a first-half lead. Forssell tied the game early in the second half, but Gabriel Agbonlahor gave Villa all three points. The Villa game was to be the last game in charge of the Blues for Steve Bruce, who left the club to join Wigan Athletic on 20 November 2007. This left Bruce's assistant Eric Black in charge for the game against Portsmouth at St Andrew's. Debutant goalkeeper Richard Kingson was at fault for Portsmouth's first goal as Sulley Muntari's shot rolled under the arms of the keeper. Niko Kranjčar added a late second as Portsmouth strolled to victory. Black's short reign as Blues manager ended on 26 November as he left to join Bruce at Wigan. The following day, former Scotland manager Alex McLeish was appointed manager of the club. McLeish had quit Scotland the day before to take over at the midlands club, and brought his two Scottish assistants, Andy Watson and former Villa caretaker manager Roy Aitken.

=== December ===
McLeish's first game in charge was a tricky visit to Tottenham Hotspur. Gary McSheffrey was able to give the Blues a first-half lead from a penalty given away by Younès Kaboul. It all changed in the early stages of the second half, as Robbie Keane scored twice, the first from another penalty that was won by Dimitar Berbatov, the second due to bad defending from a corner. The game changed again as Phil Dowd sent Keane off and Jerome scored an equaliser. In the final minutes, Sebastian Larsson scored a 35-yard (32 m) screamer that secured McLeish his first victory. Next up was a trip to St James' Park to play Newcastle United. Jerome gave the Blues an early lead, but a controversial penalty was put away by Obafemi Martins, and a late Habib Beye goal gave Newcastle the three points. McLeish's first home game in charge was against Reading. A fourth-minute goal from Mikael Forssell was cancelled out again by another penalty, this time scored by Stephen Hunt. An away trip to Bolton Wanderers failed to gain any points for the Blues, as a goal from El Hadji Diouf and two from Nicolas Anelka gave Bolton an easy 3–0 win. Boxing Day saw Middlesbrough visit St Andrew's. An own goal by Stewart Downing and a Forssell goal gave the Blues a 2–0 lead at half time, and McSheffrey converted a penalty to finish off Middlesbrough's resistance. The last game of 2007 saw Fulham entertained at St Andrew's. An early Carlos Bocanegra goal was not enough to give Fulham a win as a 55th-minute Larsson goal shared the points.

December also saw the collapse of Carson Yeung's attempted takeover of the club. The board decided to terminate talks, as Yeung had failed to come up with the reported £35m to buy the remaining 70.1% shares of the club. David Gold also confirmed that there would be no chance of another takeover bid until summer 2008.

=== January ===
January would see the Blues play three of the "big four" in English football. First up was a trip to Old Trafford to play Manchester United. Carlos Tevez struck the only goal of the game for the Manchester side 25 minutes in. Next up in the league for the Blues was their first ever trip to the Emirates Stadium to take on Arsenal. A penalty from Emmanuel Adebayor had given Arsenal a first half lead, but the Blues fought back to earn a point just after half time through O'Connor's header from a Larsson corner. The third of the "big four" were Chelsea, who visited St Andrew's. It took a late goal from Claudio Pizarro to beat Blues, as Chelsea took all three points from the encounter. The last game of the month was a must-win tie in the north east as the Blues took on Sunderland. But it was not to be as Sunderland won a one sided encounter with goals from Daryl Murphy and Rade Prica.

January also saw the opening of the transfer window. McLeish was able to strengthen his side with the signings of left back David Murphy for £1.5m from Hibernian, striker James McFadden for £5m from Everton and the loan signing of striker Mauro Zárate from Qatari side Al-Sadd. McLeish also allowed some fringe players to leave the club: Neil Kilkenny joining Leeds United for £150,000, Rowan Vine joined Queens Park Rangers for £1n, Neil Danns joined Crystal Palace for £600,000, and Mat Sadler joined Watford for £750,000. Defender Olivier Tébily was also allowed to leave the club after not featuring in the side since the start of the previous season.

=== February ===
February featured three Premier League encounters. Derby County were in real trouble in the Premier League, occupying 20th position, with 19th-place Fulham well out of reach for the East Midlands club. Their visit to St Andrew's also saw the return of Robbie Savage who left the Blues back in 2005. A Larsson goal looked like it had secured a valuable three points for the Blues before an 89th-minute Emanuel Villa goal secured a point for Derby. A trip to West Ham was next up for the Blues. Freddie Ljungberg scored in the opening encounters for the Hammers, but a penalty from new signing McFadden made sure that the Blues would at least leave with a point. The last game of the month was a home match between the Blues and Arsenal. A 28th-minute free kick from McFadden opened the scoring, before two Theo Walcott goals within five minutes looked to have given the points to Arsenal, before an injury time McFadden penalty stole a point for the Blues. The game became highly controversial as within minutes of the kick off, a badly timed challenge by centre-back Martin Taylor broke the leg of Arsenal striker Eduardo. No one could complain about the automatic red card that referee Mike Dean showed Taylor, but comments after the game by Arsène Wenger campaigned for a much longer ban than the traditional three-match ban. Although Wenger later retracted his comments, his idea gained support with Sepp Blatter in particular, who campaigned for Taylor to be punished with a season-long ban. The defender also received death threats from supporters of the Croatia national team, as Eduardo would miss Euro 2008 in the summer.

=== March ===
March started with the newly crowned League Cup winners visiting St Andrew's. It was not to be Tottenham's day, however, as the Blues emphatically won 4–1. A Forssell hat-trick and a free kick from Larsson saw the Blues lead 4–0 before a late Jermaine Jenas goal in second half injury time saw Maik Taylor fail to get his clean sheet. Next up for the Blues was a tricky away tie to another team going well in a domestic cup. Portsmouth, who had just qualified for the semi-final of the FA Cup, went into an early two-goal lead thanks to Jermain Defoe, before goals from Fabrice Muamba and another Larsson free kick saw Blues complete a first-half comeback. Second-half goals from Hermann Hreiðarsson and Nwankwo Kanu saw the Blues fail to get anything from the south coast.

The next two Blues games would see the team go head to head with other Premier League teams in trouble at the foot of the table. Newcastle were first up at St Andrew's, where a James McFadden goal in the first half was cancelled out by an early goal in the second half by Michael Owen. Then it was a trip to the Madejski Stadium, where Reading were able to capitalise on poor defending from set plays to earn a 2–1 victory, leaving the Blues only a point from 18th placed Bolton. The only highlight of the game was a goal for Mauro Zárate. The last game of the month saw Manchester City visit St Andrew's. Two Zárate goals and a penalty by Gary McSheffrey were enough to overcome the Manchester team, who scored with a penalty of their own from Elano.

=== April ===
The first game in April came on the 5th, an away trip to Wigan. Former Birmingham boss Steve Bruce managed his side to a 2–0 win over Birmingham, with Ryan Taylor scoring both the goals. Also in that match, club captain Damien Johnson was sent off for two-footed foul on Kevin Kilbane. A week later, Birmingham were at home against Everton. Zárate rescued a point for the Blues with a 25-yard (23 m) free kick in the 83rd minute, after defender Joleon Lescott put Everton in front. The game ended in a 1–1 draw. At this time Birmingham were 17th in the table. The Birmingham Derby took place eight days later as Birmingham were beaten 5–1 by Aston Villa away at Villa Park. Ashley Young and John Carew each scored twice. Forssell got a consolation goal for Blues, then Agbonlahor finished it off for Aston Villa.

With other teams' results around them not going their way, Blues dropped to 18th in the league table. Birmingham's final game of April came on the 26th against Liverpool at St Andrew's. Birmingham went into this game having drawn four and won two of their last six meetings against Liverpool in the Premier League. Birmingham opened the scoring through Forssell on the 34th minute, were looking comfortable throughout most of the game, and Larsson scored a 30-yard free kick to make it 2–0. Birmingham, however, let their lead slip, after Peter Crouch and Yossi Benayoun both scored for Liverpool to share the points. Birmingham remained in 18th position.

=== May ===
At the end of season awards ceremony, held at the International Convention Centre, Birmingham, Sebastian Larsson swept the board of player-of-the-season honours, and also won the goal-of-the-season and "magic moment" awards for his stoppage-time goal at Tottenham in December. Jordon Mutch was Academy player of the season, and Stephen Kelly received an outstanding achievement award for playing every minute of the Premier League season.

A must-win game for Birmingham against relegation rivals Fulham followed, described by McLeish as "the most important game of the season". The first half ended goalless, but Fulham took the lead through Brian McBride. Erik Nevland then doubled Fulham's tally in the 87th minute, and the game ended 2–0. It took Fulham out of the relegation zone, while Birmingham fell to 19th. Birmingham's final game of the season saw them score four goals against Blackburn. A first-half goal from David Murphy was cancelled out by Blackburn's Morten Gamst Pedersen early in the second half. After a miss from close range by Cameron Jerome, the striker responded by scoring two goals, and Muamba got a late goal. It turned out not to be enough, as both Fulham and Reading secured wins, which left Birmingham to be relegated back to the Championship in 19th place. In Birmingham's last game in the 2007–08 Premier League season, they beat Blackburn 4–1. The game saw the Birmingham fans calling for the board to resign after the club was relegated.

== Post-season ==
Birmingham issued a statement confirming that CCTV footage of the pitch invasion had been given to the police and recommended the courts impose banning orders on anyone found guilty. They announced a profit of about £32.6m, which was up from £14.3m the previous year. Sammy Yu, speaking on behalf of major shareholder Carson Yeung, released a statement saying that Yeung still wanted to buy the club.

David Sullivan blamed former manager Steve Bruce for the club's relegation, accusing him of buying poorly the previous summer, and singled out Franck Queudrue and Richard Kingson as particularly poor, calling Kingson a "waste of space". Queudrue hit back, saying that he had not played enough to be judged so harshly. Sullivan apologised to Queudrue for his outburst, but not to Kingson, who expressed his sadness at the incident, which he described as a "slap in the face". Kingson was released: McLeish said, "It's about opinions and we have other plans, so for the sake of his first-team future, we have let Richard move on."

Birmingham also decided to release youth players Asa Hall, David Howland, Adam Legzdins and Stefan Milojević, McLeish chose not to pursue the purchase of loanee Rafael Schmitz, and Daniël de Ridder's contract was cancelled by mutual consent at the end of June; he joined Wigan the following day. The club were unable to agree a new contract with top scorer Mikael Forssell, and chose not to take up their two-year option, so he left for Hannover 96 on a free transfer under the Bosman ruling. Fabrice Muamba, the club's Young Player of the Year in 2006–07, signed for Bolton Wanderers for an initial £5m fee, with an extra £750,000 potentially payable in add-ons.

Two members of the backroom staff also left the club: fitness coach Dan Harris joined West Bromwich Albion and physiotherapist Neil McDiarmid ended a 14-year connection with the club to concentrate on private practice.

McLeish said that he would not rush into signing new players, but that he would take time to make sure he buys quality players to help the club achieve promotion back to the Premier league at the first time of asking. He urged fans to be patient, as most signings would happen during July. He was aiming for a minimum squad size of 23, and expected to retain Larsson and McFadden. The club decided to activate the one-year option on Tunisian midfielder Mehdi Nafti's contract, which had been due to expire in June. McLeish told Maik Taylor he would remain as first-choice goalkeeper if he agreed a new contract; Taylor signed a two-year deal a few weeks later. It was confirmed that Everton midfielder Lee Carsley would join Birmingham on a free transfer when his contract expired.

Aberdeen University announced the award of an honorary degree to Alex McLeish in recognition of his distinguished service to football.

== Premier League ==
=== Match details ===
General sources (match reports): Match content not verifiable from these sources is referenced individually.

| Date | League position | Opponents | Venue | Result | Score F–A | Scorers | Attendance | Refs |
|---|---|---|---|---|---|---|---|---|
| 12 August 2007 | 13th | Chelsea | A | L | 2–3 | Forssell 15', Kapo 36' | 41,590 | |
| 15 August 2007 | 13th | Sunderland | H | D | 2–2 | Paul McShane 28', o.g., O'Connor 82' | 24,898 | |
| 18 August 2007 | 18th | West Ham United | H | L | 0–1 | | 24,961 | |
| 25 August 2007 | 11th | Derby County | A | W | 2–1 | Jerome (2) 1', 63' | 31,117 | |
| 1 September 2007 | 16th | Middlesbrough | A | L | 0–2 | | 22,920 | |
| 15 September 2007 | 12th | Bolton Wanderers | H | W | 1–0 | Kapo 37' | 28,124 | |
| 22 September 2007 | 12th | Liverpool | A | D | 0–0 | | 44,215 | |
| 29 September 2007 | 14th | Manchester United | H | L | 0–1 | | 26,526 | |
| 7 October 2007 | 13th | Blackburn Rovers | A | L | 1–2 | Jerome 68' | 19,316 | |
| 20 October 2007 | 14th | Manchester City | A | L | 0–1 | | 45,688 | |
| 27 October 2007 | 13th | Wigan Athletic | H | W | 3–2 | Kapo (2) 26' pen., 81', Liam Ridgewell 67' | 27,661 | |
| 3 November 2007 | 14th | Everton | A | L | 1–3 | Kapo 80' | 35,155 | |
| 11 November 2007 | 15th | Aston Villa | H | L | 1–2 | Forssell 62' | 26,539 | |
| 24 November 2007 | 16th | Portsmouth | H | L | 0–2 | | 22,089 | |
| 2 December 2007 | 12th | Tottenham Hotspur | A | W | 3–2 | McSheffrey 24' pen., Jerome 62', Larsson 90+2' | 35,635 | |
| 8 December 2007 | 13th | Newcastle United | A | L | 1–2 | Jerome 9' | 49,948 | |
| 15 December 2007 | 15th | Reading | H | D | 1–1 | Forssell 4' | 27,300 | |
| 22 December 2007 | 16th | Bolton Wanderers | A | L | 0–3 | | 19,111 | |
| 26 December 2007 | 14th | Middlesbrough | H | W | 3–0 | Downing 22' o.g., Forssell 45', McSheffrey 90' pen. | 24,094 | |
| 29 December 2007 | 15th | Fulham | H | D | 1–1 | Forssell 55' | 28,293 | |
| 1 January 2008 | 15th | Manchester United | A | L | 0–1 | | 75,459 | |
| 12 January 2008 | 16th | Arsenal | A | D | 1–1 | O'Connor 48' | 60,037 | |
| 19 January 2008 | 16th | Chelsea | H | L | 0–1 | | 26,567 | |
| 29 January 2008 | 17th | Sunderland | A | L | 0–2 | | 37,674 | |
| 2 February 2008 | 18th | Derby County | H | D | 1–1 | Larsson 68' | 25,924 | |
| 9 February 2008 | 17th | West Ham United | A | D | 1–1 | McFadden 16' pen. | 34,884 | |
| 23 February 2008 | 17th | Arsenal | H | D | 2–2 | McFadden (2) 28', 90+5' pen. | 27,195 | |
| 1 March 2008 | 16th | Tottenham Hotspur | H | W | 4–1 | Forssell (3) 7', 59', 81', Larsson 55' | 26,055 | |
| 12 March 2008 | 17th | Portsmouth | A | L | 2–4 | Muamba 10', Larsson 40' | 20,138 | |
| 17 March 2008 | 16th | Newcastle United | H | D | 1–1 | McFadden 33' | 25,777 | |
| 22 March 2008 | 17th | Reading | A | L | 1–2 | Zárate 64' | 24,085 | |
| 29 March 2008 | 17th | Manchester City | H | W | 3–1 | Zárate (2) 40', 54', McSheffrey 77' pen. | 22,962 | |
| 5 April 2008 | 17th | Wigan Athletic | A | L | 0–2 | | 17,926 | |
| 12 April 2008 | 17th | Everton | H | D | 1–1 | Zárate 83' | 25,923 | |
| 20 April 2008 | 18th | Aston Villa | A | L | 1–5 | Forssell 67' | 42,584 | |
| 25 April 2008 | 18th | Liverpool | H | D | 2–2 | Forssell 34', Larsson 55' | 29,252 | |
| 3 May 2008 | 19th | Fulham | A | L | 0–2 | | 25,308 | |
| 11 May 2008 | 19th | Blackburn Rovers | H | W | 4–1 | Murphy 31', Jerome (2) 73', 89', Muamba 90+3' | 26,668 | |

=== League table ===
| Pos | Team | Pld | W | D | L | GF | GA | GD | Pts | Qualification or relegation |
|---|---|---|---|---|---|---|---|---|---|---|
| 16 | Bolton Wanderers | 38 | 9 | 10 | 19 | 36 | 54 | −18 | 37 | |
| 17 | Fulham | 38 | 8 | 12 | 18 | 38 | 60 | −22 | 36 | |
| 18 | Reading (R) | 38 | 10 | 6 | 22 | 41 | 66 | −25 | 36 | Relegation to Football League Championship |
| 19 | Birmingham City (R) | 38 | 8 | 11 | 19 | 46 | 62 | −16 | 35 | Relegation to Football League Championship |
| 20 | Derby County (R) | 38 | 1 | 8 | 29 | 20 | 89 | −69 | 11 | Relegation to Football League Championship |

Source: Barclays Premier League
Rules for classification: 1) points; 2) goal difference; 3) number of goals scored.
For further information on European qualification see Premier League – Competition
(R) Relegated

=== Results summary ===
| Overall | | | | | | | | Home | | | | | | Away | | | | | |
| Pld | W | D | L | GF | GA | GD | Pts | W | D | L | GF | GA | GD | W | D | L | GF | GA | GD |
|---|---|---|---|---|---|---|---|---|---|---|---|---|---|---|---|---|---|---|---|
| 38 | 8 | 11 | 19 | 46 | 62 | −16 | 35 | 6 | 8 | 5 | 30 | 23 | +7 | 2 | 3 | 14 | 16 | 39 | −23 |

== FA Cup ==
Birmingham's third round encounter pitted them against League One opponents Huddersfield Town at the Galpharm Stadium. Huddersfield took an early lead thanks to Luke Beckett, but the Blues struck back with Garry O'Connor on target to take the game into half time at 1–1. But it was to be Huddersfield's day as a late goal from Chris Brandon saw them advance into the fourth round.

| Round | Date | Opponents | Venue | Result | Score F–A | Scorers | Attendance | Report |
|---|---|---|---|---|---|---|---|---|
| Third round | 5 January 2008 | Huddersfield Town | A | L | 1–2 | O'Connor 19' | 13,410 | |

== Football League Cup ==
The last game in August saw League Two Hereford United visit St Andrew's in the second round of the League Cup. Two first half goals from Garry O'Connor and Gary McSheffrey saw Blues lead at half time, only for Hereford to fight back in the second half to score through Theo Robinson. But it was too little too late from the Herefordshire side as Blues dumped them out of the cup. Blues' exploits in the League Cup came to an undramatic end as they bowed out to Blackburn Rovers at Ewood Park. Goals from David Bentley, Matt Derbyshire and Roque Santa Cruz were enough to see off a much weakened Blues team.

| Round | Date | Opponents | Venue | Result | Score F–A | Scorers | Attendance | Report |
|---|---|---|---|---|---|---|---|---|
| Second round | 28 August 2007 | Hereford United | H | W | 2–1 | O'Connor 27', McSheffrey 38' | 10,185 | |
| Third round | 26 September 2007 | Blackburn Rovers | A | L | 0–3 | | 9,205 | |

== Transfers ==
=== In ===
| Date | Player | Club† | Fee | Ref |
|---|---|---|---|---|
| 11 May 2007 | Fabrice Muamba | Arsenal | Undisclosed | |
| 28 June 2007 | Garry O'Connor | Lokomotiv Moscow | £2,700,000 | |
| 29 June 2007 | Olivier Kapo | Juventus | Free | |
| 1 July 2007 | Stuart Parnaby | (Middlesbrough) | Free | |
| 3 July 2007 | Daniël de Ridder | (Celta Vigo) | Free | |
| 4 July 2007 | Richard Kingson | Antalyaspor | Undisclosed | |
| 3 August 2007 | Franck Queudrue | Fulham | £2,500,000 | |
| 3 August 2007 | Liam Ridgewell | Aston Villa | £2,000,000 | |
| 16 January 2008 | David Murphy | Hibernian | £1,500,000 | |
| 18 January 2008 | James McFadden | Everton | £4,750,000 | |

† Brackets round club names denote the player's contract with that club expired before he joined Birmingham City.

=== Out ===
| Date | Player | Fee | Joined† | Ref |
|---|---|---|---|---|
| 1 July 2007 | Bruno Ngotty | Free | (Leicester City) | |
| 10 July 2007 | Julian Gray | Free | (Coventry City) | |
| 13 July 2007 | Stephen Clemence | £1,000,000 | Leicester City | |
| 20 July 2007 | DJ Campbell | £2,100,000 | Leicester City | |
| 7 January 2008 | Neil Kilkenny | Undisclosed | Leeds United | |
| 8 January 2008 | Sam Oji | Free | (Leyton Orient) | |
| 8 January 2008 | Rowan Vine | £1,000,000 | Queens Park Rangers | |
| 14 January 2008 | Olivier Tébily | Released | (Toronto FC) | |
| 22 January 2008 | Neil Danns | £600,000 | Crystal Palace | |
| 24 January 2008 | Mat Sadler | £750,000 | Watford | |
| 16 May 2008 | Richard Kingson | Released | (Wigan Athletic) | |
| 16 June 2008 | Fabrice Muamba | £5,000,000 | Bolton Wanderers | |
| 30 June 2008 | Daniël de Ridder | Released | (Wigan Athletic) | |
| 30 June 2008 | Mikael Forssell | Released | (Hannover 96) | |
| 30 June 2008 | Asa Hall | Released | (Luton Town) | |
| 30 June 2008 | David Howland | Released | (Port Vale) | |
| 30 June 2008 | Adam Legzdins | Released | (Crewe Alexandra) | |
| 30 June 2008 | Stefan Milojević | Released | (Chênois) | |

† Brackets round club names denote the player joined that club after his Birmingham City contract expired.

=== Loan in ===
| Date | Player | Club | Return | Ref |
|---|---|---|---|---|
| 6 July 2007 | Rafael Schmitz | Lille | End of season | |
| 10 August 2007 | Johan Djourou | Arsenal | January 2008 | |
| 31 August 2007 | Borja Oubiña | Celta Vigo | 11 February 2008 | |
| 31 August 2007 | Wilson Palacios | Deportivo Olimpia | 2 January 2008 | |
| 21 January 2008 | Mauro Zárate | Al-Sadd | End of season | |

=== Loan out ===
| Date | Player | Club | Return | Ref |
|---|---|---|---|---|
| 10 August 2007 | Neil Kilkenny | Oldham Athletic | 1 January 2008 | |
| 28 August 2007 | Sam Oji | Leyton Orient | Three months | |
| 31 August 2007 | Sone Aluko | Aberdeen | End of season | |
| 1 October 2007 | Adam Legzdins | Halifax Town | End of season | |
| 2 October 2007 | Rowan Vine | Queens Park Rangers | January 2008 | |
| 1 November 2007 | Martin Taylor | Sheffield United | 8 December 2007 | |
| 8 November 2007 | Krystian Pearce | Notts County | Two months | |
| 16 January 2008 | Asa Hall | Shrewsbury Town | End of season | |
| 23 January 2008 | David Howland | Port Vale | End of season | |
| 31 January 2008 | Artur Krysiak | Gretna | End of season | |
| 31 January 2008 | Krystian Pearce | Port Vale | Three months | |

== Appearances and goals ==
Numbers in parentheses denote appearances made as a substitute.
Players marked † left the club during the playing season.
Players with names in italics and marked * were on loan from another club for the whole of their season with Birmingham.
Players listed with no appearances have been in the matchday squad but only as unused substitutes.
Key to positions: GK – Goalkeeper; DF – Defender; MF – Midfielder; FW – Forward

Players' appearances and goals by competition
| No. | Pos. | Nat. | Name | League | | FA Cup | | League Cup | | Total | | Discipline | |
| No. | Pos. | Nat. | Name | Apps | Goals | Apps | Goals | Apps | Goals | Apps | Goals | A yellow rectangle, denoting the yellow penalty card shown to a player being cautioned | A red rectangle, denoting the red penalty card shown to a player being sent off |
|---|---|---|---|---|---|---|---|---|---|---|---|---|---|
| 1 | GK | NIR | Maik Taylor | 34 | 0 | 1 | 0 | 0 | 0 | 35 | 0 | 1 | 0 |
| 2 | DF | IRE | Stephen Kelly | 38 | 0 | 1 | 0 | 1 | 0 | 40 | 0 | 2 | 0 |
| 3 | DF | ENG | Mat Sadler † | 3 (2) | 0 | 0 | 0 | 2 | 0 | 5 (2) | 0 | 0 | 0 |
| 4 | DF | ENG | Martin Taylor | 4 | 0 | 0 | 0 | 1 | 0 | 5 | 0 | 0 | 1 |
| 5 | DF | BRA | Rafael Schmitz * | 12 (3) | 0 | 0 | 0 | 0 (1) | 0 | 12 (4) | 0 | 2 | 0 |
| 6 | DF | ENG | Liam Ridgewell | 35 | 1 | 1 | 0 | 1 | 0 | 37 | 1 | 11 | 0 |
| 7 | MF | SWE | Sebastian Larsson | 32 (3) | 6 | 1 | 0 | 1 | 0 | 34 (3) | 6 | 5 | 0 |
| 8 | FW | SCO | Garry O'Connor | 5 (18) | 2 | 1 | 1 | 2 | 1 | 8 (18) | 4 | 0 | 0 |
| 9 | FW | FIN | Mikael Forssell | 21 (9) | 9 | 1 | 0 | 1 | 0 | 23 (9) | 9 | 0 | 0 |
| 10 | FW | ENG | Cameron Jerome | 21 (12) | 7 | 0 (1) | 0 | 0 | 0 | 21 (13) | 7 | 3 | 0 |
| 11 | MF | ENG | Gary McSheffrey | 24 (8) | 3 | 1 | 0 | 1 | 1 | 26 (8) | 4 | 4 | 0 |
| 12 | MF | TUN | Mehdi Nafti | 19 (7) | 0 | 0 | 0 | 1 | 0 | 20 (7) | 0 | 8 | 0 |
| 13 | GK | IRE | Colin Doyle | 3 | 0 | 0 (1) | 0 | 0 (1) | 0 | 3 (2) | 0 | 1 | 0 |
| 14 | DF | ENG | David Murphy | 14 | 1 | 0 | 0 | 0 | 0 | 14 | 1 | 2 | 0 |
| 15 | DF | FRA | Franck Queudrue | 14 (2) | 0 | 1 | 0 | 0 | 0 | 15 (2) | 0 | 4 | 1 |
| 16 | DF | SUI | Johan Djourou * † | 13 | 0 | 0 | 0 | 0 | 0 | 13 | 0 | 0 | 0 |
| 16 | FW | SCO | James McFadden | 10 (2) | 4 | 0 | 0 | 0 | 0 | 10 (2) | 4 | 2 | 0 |
| 17 | MF | ENG | Neil Danns † | 0 (2) | 0 | 0 | 0 | 2 | 0 | 2 (2) | 0 | 0 | 0 |
| 18 | GK | GHA | Richard Kingson | 1 | 0 | 0 | 0 | 2 | 0 | 3 | 0 | 0 | 0 |
| 19 | FW | ENG | Rowan Vine † | 0 | 0 | 0 | 0 | 2 | 0 | 2 | 0 | 0 | 0 |
| 19 | FW | ARG | Mauro Zárate * | 6 (8) | 4 | 0 | 0 | 0 | 0 | 6 (8) | 4 | 1 | 0 |
| 20 | MF | NED | Daniël de Ridder | 6 (4) | 0 | 1 | 0 | 1 | 0 | 8 (4) | 0 | 1 | 0 |
| 21 | DF | ENG | Stuart Parnaby | 4 (9) | 0 | 0 | 0 | 2 | 0 | 6 (9) | 0 | 2 | 0 |
| 22 | MF | NIR | Damien Johnson | 17 | 0 | 0 | 0 | 1 | 0 | 18 | 0 | 5 | 1 |
| 23 | FW | FRA | Olivier Kapo | 22 (4) | 5 | 0 | 0 | 0 | 0 | 22 (4) | 5 | 5 | 0 |
| 24 | DF | TUN | Radhi Jaïdi | 18 | 0 | 1 | 0 | 1 | 0 | 20 | 0 | 6 | 0 |
| 25 | MF | ENG | Sone Aluko | 0 | 0 | 0 | 0 | 0 (1) | 0 | 0 (1) | 0 | 0 | 0 |
| 26 | MF | ENG | Fabrice Muamba | 37 | 2 | 1 | 0 | 0 | 0 | 38 | 2 | 5 | 0 |
| 28 | MF | HON | Wilson Palacios * † | 4 (3) | 0 | 0 | 0 | 0 (1) | 0 | 4 (4) | 0 | 2 | 0 |
| 29 | MF | ESP | Borja Oubiña * † | 1 (1) | 0 | 0 | 0 | 0 | 0 | 1 (1) | 0 | 0 | 0 |
| 30 | DF | ENG | Krystian Pearce | 0 | 0 | 0 | 0 | 0 | 0 | 0 | 0 | 0 | 0 |
| 31 | MF | ENG | Jordon Mutch | 0 | 0 | 0 | 0 | 0 | 0 | 0 | 0 | 0 | 0 |
| — | MF | NIR | David Howland (Note: Birmingham had originally selected the 15-year-old Jordon Mutch for the League Cup fourth round tie against Blackburn Rovers in September 2007, having obtained confirmation from the Premier League that it was within the rules for a boy of that age to play, but were informed less than two hours before kick-off that under the Football Association's child protection policy Mutch would not be eligible. Special dispensation was granted for Howland, who had not been allocated a squad number, to take his place on the bench wearing a numberless shirt.) | 0 | 0 | 0 | 0 | 0 | 0 | 0 | 0 | 0 | 0 |

Players not included in matchday squads
| No. | Pos. | Nat. | Name |
|---|---|---|---|
| 14 | MF | AUS | Neil Kilkenny † |
| 27 | MF | CIV | Olivier Tébily † |
