= 2008–09 Birmingham City F.C. season =

Birmingham City F.C.
2008–09 season
- Chairman: David Gold
- Manager: Alex McLeish
- Ground: St Andrew's
- Championship: 2nd (promoted)
- FA Cup: Third round
- League Cup: Third round
- Top goalscorer: Kevin Phillips (14)
- Highest home attendance: 25,935 vs Wolverhampton Wanderers, 6 April 2009
- Lowest home attendance: 15,330 vs Derby County, 27 January 2009
- Average home league attendance: 19,081
| Home colours | Away colours |

The 2008–09 season was Birmingham City Football Club's 106th in the English football league system and their 47th in the second tier of English football. The team finished in second place in the Football League Championship to win promotion to the Premier League for the 2009–10 season.

== Pre-season ==
The kits were again manufactured by Umbro and bore the name of sponsors F&C Investments. The home shirt was royal blue with white sleeve trim, shorts were royal blue and socks were white. The away shirt was in a "penguin" style, white with a broad red central front panel, and was worn with white shorts and red socks. McLeish appointed former Celtic head physiotherapist Tim Williamson, Norwich City physio Peter Shaw, and British Olympic Association sports scientist Ben Rosenblatt to his backroom staff. With club captain Damien Johnson awaiting surgery on a back problem expected to keep him out for at least two months, Lee Carsley, who joined Birmingham when his contract at Everton expired, was appointed team captain in his absence. The first team's relegation from the Premier League made the reserve team ineligible for the Premier Reserve League, and the club decided not to enter any other reserve league.

When the players returned for pre-season training, Franck Queudrue and Olivier Kapo failed to arrive. Queudrue claimed that he had mistaken the date, and Kapo was still in France receiving treatment on a hand injury. The club later announced that Queudrue could leave on a free transfer, and Kapo was fined. After a delay caused by Birmingham's insistence that he could only leave once the fine was paid, Kapo completed a move back to the Premier League with Wigan Athletic, where he was reunited with former Birmingham manager Steve Bruce. Young goalkeeper Artur Krysiak joined York City on loan for a month.

On 9 July, Kevin Phillips signed a two-year contract with the club. Phillips had scored 24 goals for West Bromwich Albion the previous season, helping his club to promotion to the Premier League, but turned down their offer of a one-year deal in favour of a two-year contract in the Championship. Forward Marcus Bent joined from Charlton Athletic for a fee reportedly in excess of £1 million; he was on the verge of signing for Cardiff City, but changed his mind at the last minute. Birmingham also made two loan signings. AZ Alkmaar's Netherlands under-21 international midfielder Kemy Agustien joined for the season, and Ghana senior international and former Arsenal winger Quincy Owusu-Abeyie signed from Spartak Moscow, initially until January 2009. In each case there was a possibility of making the loan permanent. Attempts to sign Celtic defender Bobo Baldé fell through because of the player's wage demands, and after Derby County midfielder Stephen Pearson's medical revealed a groin problem, he refused Birmingham's offer of a loan deal instead.

On the field, a different eleven played each half of a 2–2 draw with Hereford United in a behind-closed-doors training match, before Birmingham embarked on a three-match tour of Austria. They began with a 7–0 defeat of local team Kirchberg, with two goals each from Gary McSheffrey and Phillips and one from Liam Ridgewell, Garry O'Connor, and David Murphy, who converted a corner taken by the 16-year-old Jordon Mutch. O'Connor, McSheffrey and Mehdi Nafti scored as a Birmingham team including trialists Zola Matumona and Yamoudou Camara beat Czech side Viktoria Plzeň 3–1 in the second tour match. The 16-year-old Jordon Mutch played the full 90 minutes and was involved in the build-up to the first two goals. O'Connor's goalscoring form continued, and James McFadden's alert reaction to a goalkeeping error gave Birmingham a third win out of three against Nürnberg, newly relegated from the Bundesliga.

Back in England, first-half goals from Cameron Jerome and Martin Taylor saw off the challenge of the lengthy trip to League Two side Gillingham with the aid of Maik Taylor's goalkeeping, and the next day, yet another O'Connor goal gave the other half of Birmingham's squad a 1–0 win at Forest Green Rovers of the Conference. A late Kevin Phillips goal secured a 3–2 win at Leicester City, before the only pre-season game at St Andrew's, against Fulham, was the only one that Birmingham failed to win. After the kickoff was delayed because of crowd congestion, Simon Davies gave the visitors a first-half lead, equalised by Sebastian Larsson after 77 minutes. A hamstring injury sustained by Radhi Jaïdi proved less serious than first appeared.

Pre-season friendly match details
| Date | Opponents | Venue | Result | Score F–A | Scorers | Attendance | Report |
|---|---|---|---|---|---|---|---|
| 15 July 2008 | Kirchberg | A | W | 7–0 | McSheffrey (2) 30' pen., 39', Ridgewell 45+1', O'Connor 53', Kevin Phillips (2) 57', 73, Murphy 67' | | |
| 17 July 2008 | Viktoria Plzeň | N | W | 3–1 | O'Connor 13', McSheffrey 15', Nafti 78' | | |
| 20 July 2008 | Nürnberg | N | W | 2–1 | O'Connor 1', McFadden 17' | | |
| 26 July 2008 | Gillingham | A | W | 2–0 | Jerome 14', Martin Taylor 20' | 1,742 | |
| 27 July 2008 | Forest Green Rovers | A | W | 1–0 | O'Connor 88' | 934 | |
| 29 July 2008 | Leicester City | A | W | 3–2 | Larsson 27', Phillips (2) 78', 90' | 6,354 | |
| 2 August 2008 | Fulham | H | D | 1–1 | Larsson 78' | | |

== The Championship ==
=== August–September ===
The new season opened on a wet and windy 9 August with the visit of Sheffield United. The game was heading for a goalless draw when substitute Kevin Phillips controlled O'Connor's headed pass, turned and scored into the bottom corner of the net in the third minute of stoppage time. It was Birmingham's first shot on target. Phillips repeated his late winner in less dramatic fashion away at former club Southampton. The home side took the lead just before the interval after defensive midfielder Nafti had gone off with a torn hamstring, but O'Connor equalised soon after the break, then, within a minute of coming off the bench, Phillips was first to react to Bent's header rebounding from the crossbar. O'Connor and Phillips – this time starting the game – gave Birmingham their third win in as many games, at home to Barnsley. The unbeaten start continued with a 1–1 draw at Norwich City. Larsson took the lead against the run of play – centre-half Martin Taylor was the pick of Birmingham's players in the first half – but Darel Russell equalised just after half-time, and both McSheffrey and Phillips missed late chances to steal all three points.

When the league resumed after the international break, Artur Krysiak was on the bench while regular reserve goalkeeper Colin Doyle recovered from a knee operation. Nafti was sent off after 24 minutes for a two-footed lunge on James Coppinger, and at half-time, McLeish replaced Phillips with Marcus Bent to play as a lone striker; 35 seconds later, Birmingham had the lead, after Liam Ridgewell's long free kick was headed on by Bent and Cameron Jerome volleyed past the goalkeeper. Maik Taylor produced a fine save near the end to turn Darren Byfield's powerful 30-yard (27 m) shot onto the post. At half-time, a clock was unveiled in memory of Birmingham and England full-back Jeff Hall, who died of polio in 1959 aged just 29, and whose death helped to kick-start widespread public acceptance in Britain of the need for vaccination. Hall's teammates Gil Merrick and Alex Govan performed the unveiling.

A Louis Carey own goal and Jerome's second goal in four days gave Birmingham another three points at Bristol City, but their unbeaten start to the Championship campaign finally ended on 20 September at home to Blackpool. After Gary Taylor-Fletcher's goal, Birmingham threw everyone forward but without success. Normal service resumed at Cardiff City, where first league goals of the season for James McFadden and Quincy Owusu-Abeyie secured the win, and Quincy's second league goal was nearly enough at Derby County, but Steve Davies tied the scores in the 87th minute.

McLeish had said he hoped to bring in loan signings, but would not bring in players "just to make up the numbers". He was unwilling to take trialist Nigel Quashie on loan until the player had proved his fitness, and although an agreement had been made with Tottenham Hotspur to take Kevin-Prince Boateng on loan, McLeish was unable to meet the player face-to-face to assess his interest in joining the club.

=== October–November ===
In stoppage time of a first half described in the Sunday People as "marginally more exciting than root-canal dental treatment", at home to Queens Park Rangers, Phillips tapped in an O'Connor cutback for a win that took Birmingham top of the table. Phillips made it clear afterwards that he wanted to be in the starting eleven: "I want to start games. I'm disappointed I haven't started as many as I wanted. All I can do is score and make it as hard as possible for him [McLeish] to leave me out." After the international break, Birmingham had much the worse of the visit to Burnley, but they managed to draw when McFadden's shot was parried to Jerome who scored from close range. Martin Taylor replaced Jaïdi at centre-back because of a thigh injury sustained on international duty, and Murphy injured a knee during the match, while both Damien Johnson and Kelly returned to training, and Quashie joined on loan for a month.

Franck Queudrue made his first start of the season at home to Crystal Palace. After twice hitting the woodwork, O'Connor scored the game's only goal when Julián Speroni parried Phillips' 94th-minute cross to his feet. In the midweek match, at home to Sheffield Wednesday, O'Connor scored twice and Wednesday's Etienne Esajas once in a four-minute spell before Phillips made the final score 3–1 from Queudrue's "inch-perfect" through ball. O'Connor was injured in the warm-up, and Stuart Parnaby went off after 10 minutes of the match against Queens Park Rangers at Loftus Road, giving teenage right-back Jared Wilson what would be his only competitive first-team appearance for Birmingham. Mikele Leigertwood was sent off in the first half, but despite the numerical disadvantage, Samuel Di Carmine's 25-yard (23 m) shot in the 54th minute decided the match in QPR's favour – Birmingham's first away defeat in the league – after Phillips' stoppage-time "equaliser" was disallowed for offside. By the end of the match, the rain had turned to heavy wet snow.

Former Birmingham record signing Clinton Morrison gave Coventry City a 1–0 win at St Andrew's. Again, a late equaliser was denied when the assistant referee ruled that Keiren Westwood saved from Queudrue before the ball crossed the line. Martin Taylor replaced Queudrue in defence and loanee Nicky Hunt kept his place at right back as James McFadden's goal earned Birmingham a point at Nottingham Forest. Queudrue returned from illness to score the winning goal at home to Charlton Athletic; Quashie was sent off for two yellow cards. Second-half substitute Phillips scored twice at Swansea City to give Birmingham consecutive 3–2 wins, and, restored to the starting eleven in place of Quincy, scored again as Birmingham beat Ipswich Town. In an end-to-end match at league leaders Wolverhampton Wanderers in foggy conditions, McFadden had a goal disallowed for offside, the ball deflected off Ridgewell's shoulder against the post with Taylor beaten, Bent's lob was cleared off the line, and the left-footed midfielder Mehdi Nafti replaced the injured Hunt at right back, all before half-time. In the second half, goals from Jerome – only three minutes after coming on – and Sylvan Ebanks-Blake and some last-ditch defending meant the points were shared.

=== December ===
According to the Guardian's reporter, "the early defending was so slack as to suggest salaries should be chopped rather than capped", as Birmingham led Watford 2–1 after 18 minutes. The visitors began the second half well—first Jaïdi headed clear from under the crossbar, then Leigh Bromby struck the bar with Taylor beaten—and in the last few minutes of the match Jerome scored Birmingham's third, Ross Jenkins's first league goal made the score 2–3, and the three points were confirmed only when the referee signalled time moments before Jaïdi's apparent handball in the penalty area. Lee Carsley's first goal for the club secured a win under Plymouth Argyle's dim floodlights, before an attacking game at Preston North End remained goalless until stoppage time, when Ridgewell failed to deal with a cross and Jon Parkin shot home.

Apart from "a moment of individual brilliance" as Phillips "nipped in to steal the loose ball and after nutmegging Ivar Ingimarsson advanced unchallenged to the edge of the area and lashed in a stinging low drive", Reading were in complete control as they replaced Birmingham in second place in the table with a 3–1 win at St Andrew's. At Ipswich Town on Boxing Day, McFadden converted Birmingham's first penalty of the season, awarded when Kemy Agustien's cross was handled, and Agustien himself came close to extending the lead with a powerful shot. In the last match of 2008, David Murphy was sent off for two yellow cards as Swansea City earned a goalless draw at St Andrew's.

=== April–May ===
6 April – The teams in the Championship had a 2-week break because of the World Cup Qualifiers that were to be played. On the return, Blues were to play Wolverhampton Wanderers in a 1st v 2nd place top-of-the-table game. After having Lee Carsley sent off in the 37th minute for a late tackle on Chris Iwelumo that saw him stretchered off, Blues went on to score through Cameron Jerome's third goal in as many games on the stroke of half time. Striker Garry O'Connor came on to replace him and scored in the 69th minute to send Blues 2–0 up, and just two points behind Wolves in the Championship table and to distance themselves from 3rd place. It was the biggest attendance of the season at 25,935 and was also shown live on Sky Sports.

9 April – Defender Ulises de la Cruz leaves Birmingham City to return to Ecuador after decided not to extend his contract. He made one appearance for Birmingham, coming off the bench against Doncaster Rovers.

13 April – Birmingham were held 1–1 at home to Plymouth but were forced to play the majority of the game with ten men after Maik Taylor was sent off. It kept them unbeaten in eight games, winning four of them. Manager Alex McLeish said he will be appealing to the FA about the red card as it was wrongly given.

14 April – Liam Ridgewell had an operation on his broken left leg that went successfully. He was injured in the first half in the home game against Plymouth and was stretchered off.

=== Match details ===
General sources (match reports): Match content not verifiable from these sources is referenced individually.

| Date | League position | Opponents | Venue | Result | Score F–A | Scorers | Attendance | Refs |
|---|---|---|---|---|---|---|---|---|
| 9 August 2008 | 7th | Sheffield United | H | W | 1–0 | Phillips 90+3' | 24,019 | |
| 16 August 2008 | 3rd | Southampton | A | W | 2–1 | O'Connor 49', Phillips 77' | 18,925 | |
| 23 August 2008 | 1st | Barnsley | H | W | 2–0 | Phillips 13', O'Connor 45+1' | 17,413 | |
| 30 August 2008 | 3rd | Norwich City | A | D | 1–1 | Larsson 40' | 24,229 | |
| 13 September 2008 | 2nd | Doncaster Rovers | H | W | 1–0 | Jerome 46' | 18,165 | |
| 16 September 2008 | 2nd | Bristol City | A | W | 2–1 | Carey 8' o.g., Jerome 24' | 18,456 | |
| 20 September 2008 | 2nd | Blackpool | H | L | 0–1 | | 20,983 | |
| 27 September 2008 | 2nd | Cardiff City | A | W | 2–1 | McFadden 5', Quincy 41' | 18,304 | |
| 30 September 2008 | 2nd | Derby County | A | D | 1–1 | Quincy 26' | 29,743 | |
| 4 October 2008 | 1st | Queens Park Rangers | H | W | 1–0 | Phillips 45+1' | 18,498 | |
| 18 October 2008 | 2nd | Burnley | A | D | 1–1 | Jerome 77' | 13,809 | |
| 21 October 2008 | 1st | Crystal Palace | H | W | 1–0 | O'Connor 90+4' | 17,706 | |
| 25 October 2008 | 1st | Sheffield Wednesday | H | W | 3–1 | O'Connor (2) 11', 15', Phillips 38' | 17,300 | |
| 28 October 2008 | 2nd | Queens Park Rangers | A | L | 0–1 | | 13,594 | |
| 3 November 2008 | 2nd | Coventry City | H | L | 0–1 | | 17,215 | |
| 8 November 2008 | 2nd | Nottingham Forest | A | D | 1–1 | | 21,415 | |
| 15 November 2008 | 2nd | Charlton Athletic | H | W | 3–2 | McFadden 13', Phillips 50', Queudrue 55' | 20,013 | |
| 21 November 2008 | 2nd | Swansea City | A | W | 3–2 | Bent 42', Phillips (2) 74', 79' | 16,956 | |
| 25 November 2008 | 2nd | Ipswich Town | H | W | 2–1 | Ridgewell 9', Phillips 14' | 15,689 | |
| 29 November 2008 | 2nd | Wolverhampton Wanderers | A | D | 1–1 | Jerome 48' | 26,329 | |
| 6 December 2008 | 2nd | Watford | H | W | 3–2 | Phillips 8', Bent 18', Jerome 85' | 18,174 | |
| 9 December 2008 | 2nd | Plymouth Argyle | A | W | 1–0 | Carsley 62' | 10,446 | |
| 13 December 2008 | 2nd | Preston North End | A | L | 0–1 | | 10,943 | |
| 20 December 2008 | 3rd | Reading | H | L | 1–3 | Phillips 60' | 19,695 | |
| 26 December 2008 | 3rd | Ipswich Town | A | W | 1–0 | McFadden 39' pen. | 23,536 | |
| 28 December 2008 | 3rd | Swansea City | H | D | 0–0 | | 21,836 | |
| 17 January 2009 | 3rd | Cardiff City | H | D | 1–1 | Bowyer 90+4' | 19,853 | |
| 24 January 2009 | 3rd | Blackpool | A | L | 0–2 | | 8,105 | |
| 27 January 2009 | 3rd | Derby County | H | W | 1–0 | Carsley 59' | 15,330 | |
| 31 January 2009 | 3rd | Sheffield Wednesday | A | D | 1–1 | Phillips 90+3' | 18,409 | |
| 7 February 2009 | 3rd | Burnley | H | D | 1–1 | Phillips 37' | 16,763 | |
| 14 February 2009 | 2nd | Nottingham Forest | H | W | 2–0 | Bent 62', Fahey 75' | 17,631 | |
| 21 February 2009 | 2nd | Coventry City | A | L | 0–1 | | 22,637 | |
| 24 February 2009 | 2nd | Crystal Palace | A | D | 0–0 | | 12,847 | |
| 1 March 2009 | 2nd | Sheffield United | A | L | 1–2 | Morgan 74' o.g. | 24,232 | |
| 4 March 2009 | 2nd | Bristol City | H | W | 1–0 | Queudrue 87' | 17,551 | |
| 7 March 2009 | 2nd | Southampton | H | W | 1–0 | Fahey 45+1' | 16,735 | |
| 10 March 2009 | 2nd | Barnsley | A | D | 1–1 | Martin Taylor 85' | 11,299 | |
| 14 March 2009 | 2nd | Doncaster Rovers | A | W | 2–0 | Jerome 19', Bouazza 42' | 11,482 | |
| 21 March 2009 | 2nd | Norwich City | H | D | 1–1 | Jerome 38' | 18,159 | |
| 6 April 2009 | 2nd | Wolverhampton Wanderers | H | W | 2–0 | Jerome 45+4', O'Connor 69' | 25,935 | |
| 11 April 2009 | 2nd | Charlton Athletic | A | D | 0–0 | | 20,022 | |
| 13 April 2009 | 2nd | Plymouth Argyle | H | D | 1–1 | Queudrue 50' | 19,323 | |
| 18 April 2009 | 2nd | Watford | A | W | 1–0 | Jerome 73' | 16,180 | |
| 25 April 2009 | 2nd | Preston North End | H | L | 1–2 | Fahey 67' | 24,825 | |
| 3 May 2009 | 2nd | Reading | A | W | 2–1 | Fahey 19', Phillips 60' | 23,879 | |

=== League table ===
| Pos | Team | Pld | W | D | L | GF | GA | GD | Pts | Promotion, qualification or relegation |
|---|---|---|---|---|---|---|---|---|---|---|
| 1 | Wolverhampton Wanderers (C, P) | 46 | 27 | 9 | 10 | 80 | 52 | +28 | 90 | Promotion to the Premier League |
| 2 | Birmingham City (P) | 46 | 23 | 14 | 9 | 54 | 37 | +17 | 83 | Promotion to the Premier League |
| 3 | Sheffield United | 46 | 22 | 14 | 10 | 64 | 39 | +25 | 80 | Qualification for Championship play-offs |
| 4 | Reading | 46 | 21 | 14 | 11 | 72 | 40 | +32 | 77 | Qualification for Championship play-offs |
| 5 | Burnley (O, P) | 46 | 21 | 13 | 12 | 72 | 60 | +12 | 76 | Qualification for Championship play-offs |

Updated to match(es) played on 3 May 2009. Source:
Rules for classification: 1) points; 2) goal difference; 3) number of goals scored.
(C) Champions; (O) Play-off winners; (P) Promoted

=== Results summary ===
| Overall | | | | | | | | Home | | | | | | Away | | | | | |
| Pld | W | D | L | GF | GA | GD | Pts | W | D | L | GF | GA | GD | W | D | L | GF | GA | GD |
|---|---|---|---|---|---|---|---|---|---|---|---|---|---|---|---|---|---|---|---|
| 46 | 23 | 14 | 9 | 54 | 37 | +17 | 83 | 14 | 5 | 4 | 30 | 17 | +13 | 9 | 9 | 5 | 24 | 20 | +4 |

== FA Cup ==
As do all Premier League teams, Birmingham entered the FA Cup at the third round, in which they were drawn at home to Wolverhampton Wanderers. The tie was postponed from the scheduled date because of a frozen pitch, which provoked the club into a decision to install undersoil heating. Wolves took a deserved first-half lead, but their second, soon after the interval, was courtesy of referee Howard Webb inadvertently diverted Jaïdi's pass to Wolves' Andy Keogh, who broke forward and Sam Vokes scored. Webb refused a penalty appeal for Richard Stearman's apparent foul on Marcus Bent, and Jerome struck the crossbar with a powerful shot from distance.

| Round | Date | Opponents | Venue | Result | Score F–A | Scorers | Attendance | Ref |
|---|---|---|---|---|---|---|---|---|
| Third round | 13 January 2009 | Wolverhampton Wanderers | H | L | 0–2 | | 22,232 | |

== Football League Cup ==
Birmingham were drawn to play League Two club Wycombe Wanderers at Adams Park in the first round of the League Cup. They won comfortably, with goals from Mehdi Nafti – his first for the club – Sebastian Larsson, Cameron Jerome and debutant Quincy Owusu-Abeyie. They were eliminated by fellow Championship club Southampton at St Mary's by two goals to nil. Midfielder Jordon Mutch made his debut as a half-time replacement for Gary McSheffrey to become, at 16 years 268 days, Birmingham's second-youngest debutant of all time, after Trevor Francis.

| Round | Date | Opponents | Venue | Result | Score F–A | Scorers | Attendance | Ref |
|---|---|---|---|---|---|---|---|---|
| First round | 13 August 2008 | Wycombe Wanderers | A | W | 4–0 | Nafti 14', Larsson 64', Jerome 73', Quincy 86' | 2,735 | |
| Second round | 26 August 2008 | Southampton | A | L | 0–2 | | 11,331 | |

== Player transfers ==
=== In ===
| Date | Player | Club† | Fee | Ref |
|---|---|---|---|---|
| 1 July 2008 | Lee Carsley | (Everton) | Free | |
| 9 July 2008 | Kevin Phillips | (West Bromwich Albion) | Free | |
| 16 July 2008 | Marcus Bent | Charlton Athletic | £1m | |
| 2 January 2009 | Keith Fahey | St Patrick's Athletic | Undisclosed | |
| 2 January 2009 | Robin Shroot | Harrow Borough | Undisclosed | |
| 23 February 2009 | Stephen Carr | (Newcastle United) | Free | |
| 3 March 2009 | Ulises de la Cruz | (Reading) | Free | |

† Brackets round club names denote the player's contract with that club expired before he joined Birmingham City.

=== Out ===
| Date | Player | Fee | Joined† | Ref |
|---|---|---|---|---|
| 16 July 2008 | Olivier Kapo | £3.5m | Wigan Athletic | |
| 1 September 2008 | Sone Aluko | £50,000 | Aberdeen | |
| 2 April 2009 | Ulises de la Cruz | Released | (LDU Quito) | |
| 30 June 2009 | Radhi Jaïdi | Released | (Southampton) | |
| 30 June 2009 | Stephen Kelly | Released | (Fulham) | |
| 30 June 2009 | Artur Krysiak | Released | (Birmingham City) | |
| 30 June 2009 | Mehdi Nafti | Released | (Aris) | |

† Brackets round club names denote the player joined that club after his Birmingham City contract expired.

=== Loan in ===
| Date | Player | Club | Return | Ref |
|---|---|---|---|---|
| 30 July 2008 | Kemy Agustien | AZ Alkmaar | End of season | |
| 6 August 2008 | Quincy Owusu-Abeyie | Spartak Moscow | 5 January 2009 | |
| 21 October 2008 | Nigel Quashie | West Ham United | Three months | |
| 3 November 2008 | Nicky Hunt | Bolton Wanderers | 31 December 2008 | |
| 6 January 2009 | Scott Sinclair | Chelsea | End of season | |
| 8 January 2009 | Hamer Bouazza | Fulham | End of season | |
| 9 January 2009 | Lee Bowyer | West Ham United | End of season | |
| 29 January 2009 | Carlos Costly | GKS Bełchatów | End of season | |
| 9 February 2009 | Djimi Traoré | Portsmouth | Three months | |

=== Loan out ===
| Date | Player | Club | Return | Ref |
|---|---|---|---|---|
| 7 August 2008 | Artur Krysiak | York City | One month | |
| 9 August 2008 | Sone Aluko | Blackpool | 1 September 2008 | |
| 19 August 2008 | Krystian Pearce | Scunthorpe United | End of season | |
| 23 September 2008 | Artur Krysiak | Swansea City | Three months | |
| 2 January 2009 | Artur Krysiak | Motherwell | End of season | |
| 2 February 2009 | Semih Aydilek | Motherwell | End of season | |
| 2 February 2009 | Stephen Kelly | Stoke City | End of season | |
| 2 February 2009 | Jared Wilson | Chesterfield | End of season | |
| 5 March 2009 | Gary McSheffrey | Nottingham Forest | End of season | |
| 6 March 2009 | Robin Shroot | Walsall | 26 March 2009 | |

== Appearances and goals ==
Numbers in parentheses denote appearances made as a substitute.
Players marked † left the club during the playing season.
Players with names in italics and marked * were on loan from another club for the whole of their season with Birmingham.
Players listed with no appearances have been in the matchday squad but only as unused substitutes.
Key to positions: GK – Goalkeeper; DF – Defender; MF – Midfielder; FW – Forward

Players' appearances and goals by competition
| No. | Pos. | Nat. | Name | League | | FA Cup | | League Cup | | Total | | Discipline | |
| No. | Pos. | Nat. | Name | Apps | Goals | Apps | Goals | Apps | Goals | Apps | Goals | A yellow rectangle, denoting the yellow penalty card shown to a player being cautioned | A red rectangle, denoting the red penalty card shown to a player being sent off |
|---|---|---|---|---|---|---|---|---|---|---|---|---|---|
| 1 | GK | NIR | Maik Taylor | 45 | 0 | 1 | 0 | 0 | 0 | 46 | 0 | 1 | 1 |
| 2 | DF | IRE | Stephen Kelly | 2 (3) | 0 | 0 (1) | 0 | 1 | 0 | 3 (4) | 0 | 0 | 0 |
| 2 | DF | IRE | Stephen Carr | 13 | 0 | 0 | 0 | 0 | 0 | 13 | 0 | 2 | 0 |
| 3 | DF | ENG | David Murphy | 28 (2) | 0 | 0 | 0 | 2 | 0 | 30 (2) | 0 | 3 | 1 |
| 4 | DF | ENG | Nicky Hunt * † | 9 (2) | 0 | 0 | 0 | 0 | 0 | 9 (2) | 0 | 0 | 0 |
| 4 | MF | ENG | Lee Bowyer * | 17 | 1 | 0 | 0 | 0 | 0 | 17 | 1 | 6 | 1 |
| 5 | DF | ENG | Martin Taylor | 23 (1) | 1 | 0 | 0 | 1 | 0 | 24 (1) | 1 | 2 | 0 |
| 6 | DF | ENG | Liam Ridgewell | 36 | 1 | 1 | 0 | 2 | 0 | 39 | 1 | 8 | 0 |
| 7 | MF | SWE | Sebastian Larsson (Note: Soccerbase incorrectly credits the second goal in the League Cup win at Wycombe Wanderers to O'Connor rather than Larsson.) | 35 (3) | 1 | 0 | 0 | 1 | 1 | 36 (3) | 2 | 5 | 0 |
| 8 | FW | SCO | Garry O'Connor | 10 (6) | 6 | 0 | 0 | 2 | 0 | 12 (6) | 6 | 0 | 0 |
| 9 | FW | ENG | Kevin Phillips | 24 (12) | 14 | 0 | 0 | 1 (1) | 0 | 25 (13) | 14 | 1 | 0 |
| 10 | FW | ENG | Cameron Jerome | 25 (18) | 9 | 1 | 0 | 0 (1) | 1 | 26 (19) | 10 | 3 | 0 |
| 11 | MF | ENG | Gary McSheffrey | 3 (3) | 0 | 0 | 0 | 2 | 0 | 5 (3) | 0 | 0 | 0 |
| 12 | MF | TUN | Mehdi Nafti | 6 (5) | 0 | 0 | 0 | 1 | 1 | 7 (5) | 1 | 1 | 1 |
| 13 | GK | IRE | Colin Doyle | 1 (1) | 0 | 0 | 0 | 2 | 0 | 3 (1) | 0 | 0 | 0 |
| 14 | MF | NED | Kemy Agustien * | 13 (5) | 0 | 1 | 0 | 1 | 0 | 15 (5) | 0 | 2 | 0 |
| 15 | DF | TUN | Radhi Jaïdi | 30 | 0 | 1 | 0 | 0 | 0 | 31 | 0 | 6 | 0 |
| 16 | FW | SCO | James McFadden | 22 (8) | 4 | 0 | 0 | 0 | 0 | 22 (8) | 4 | 4 | 0 |
| 17 | MF | ENG | Jordon Mutch | 0 | 0 | 0 | 0 | 0 (1) | 0 | 0 (1) | 0 | 1 | 0 |
| 18 | MF | SCO | Nigel Quashie * † | 8 (2) | 0 | 1 | 0 | 0 | 0 | 9 (2) | 0 | 5 | 1 |
| 18 | FW | HON | Carlos Costly * | 3 (5) | 0 | 0 | 0 | 0 | 0 | 3 (5) | 0 | 0 | 0 |
| 19 | MF | GHA | Quincy Owusu-Abeyie * † | 12 (7) | 2 | 0 | 0 | 1 (1) | 1 | 13 (8) | 3 | 0 | 0 |
| 19 | MF | ENG | Scott Sinclair * | 8 (6) | 0 | 0 | 0 | 0 | 0 | 8 (6) | 0 | 0 | 0 |
| 20 | DF | FRA | Franck Queudrue | 23 (2) | 3 | 1 | 0 | 0 (1) | 0 | 24 (3) | 3 | 5 | 0 |
| 21 | DF | ENG | Stuart Parnaby | 19 (2) | 0 | 1 | 0 | 2 | 0 | 22 (2) | 0 | 4 | 0 |
| 22 | MF | NIR | Damien Johnson | 8 (1) | 0 | 0 (1) | 0 | 0 | 0 | 8 (2) | 0 | 2 | 0 |
| 23 | FW | ENG | Marcus Bent | 16 (17) | 3 | 1 | 0 | 1 | 0 | 18 (17) | 3 | 1 | 0 |
| 24 | MF | GER | Semih Aydilek | 0 | 0 | 0 | 0 | 0 | 0 | 0 | 0 | 0 | 0 |
| 25 | DF | ENG | Jared Wilson | 0 (1) | 0 | 0 | 0 | 0 | 0 | 0 (1) | 0 | 1 | 0 |
| 26 | MF | IRE | Lee Carsley | 41 | 2 | 1 | 0 | 2 | 0 | 44 | 2 | 5 | 1 |
| 27 | DF | ENG | Krystian Pearce | 0 | 0 | 0 | 0 | 0 | 0 | 0 | 0 | 1 | 0 |
| 28 | GK | POL | Artur Krysiak | 0 | 0 | 0 | 0 | 0 | 0 | 0 | 0 | 0 | 0 |
| 29 | MF | ENG | Ashley Sammons | 0 | 0 | 0 | 0 | 0 | 0 | 0 | 0 | 0 | 0 |
| 30 | MF | IRE | Keith Fahey | 15 (4) | 4 | 0 | 0 | 0 | 0 | 15 (4) | 4 | 0 | 0 |
| 31 | MF | ENG | Mitchell McPike | 0 | 0 | 0 | 0 | 0 | 0 | 0 | 0 | 0 | 0 |
| 32 | MF | NIR | Robin Shroot | 0 | 0 | 1 | 0 | 0 | 0 | 1 | 0 | 0 | 0 |
| 33 | MF | ALG | Hamer Bouazza * | 9 (7) | 1 | 0 | 0 | 0 | 0 | 9 (7) | 1 | 1 | 0 |
| 34 | DF | MLI | Djimi Traoré * | 2 (1) | 0 | 0 | 0 | 0 | 0 | 2 (1) | 0 | 1 | 0 |
| 35 | GK | ENG | Dean Lyness | 0 | 0 | 0 | 0 | 0 | 0 | 0 | 0 | 0 | 0 |
| 36 | DF | ECU | Ulises de la Cruz | 0 (1) | 0 | 0 | 0 | 0 | 0 | 0 (1) | 0 | 0 | 0 |

Players not included in matchday squads
| No. | Pos. | Nat. | Name |
|---|---|---|---|
| 25 | MF | ENG | Sone Aluko † |
