= Stephen Kelly (footballer, born 1983) =

Irish footballer (born 1983)

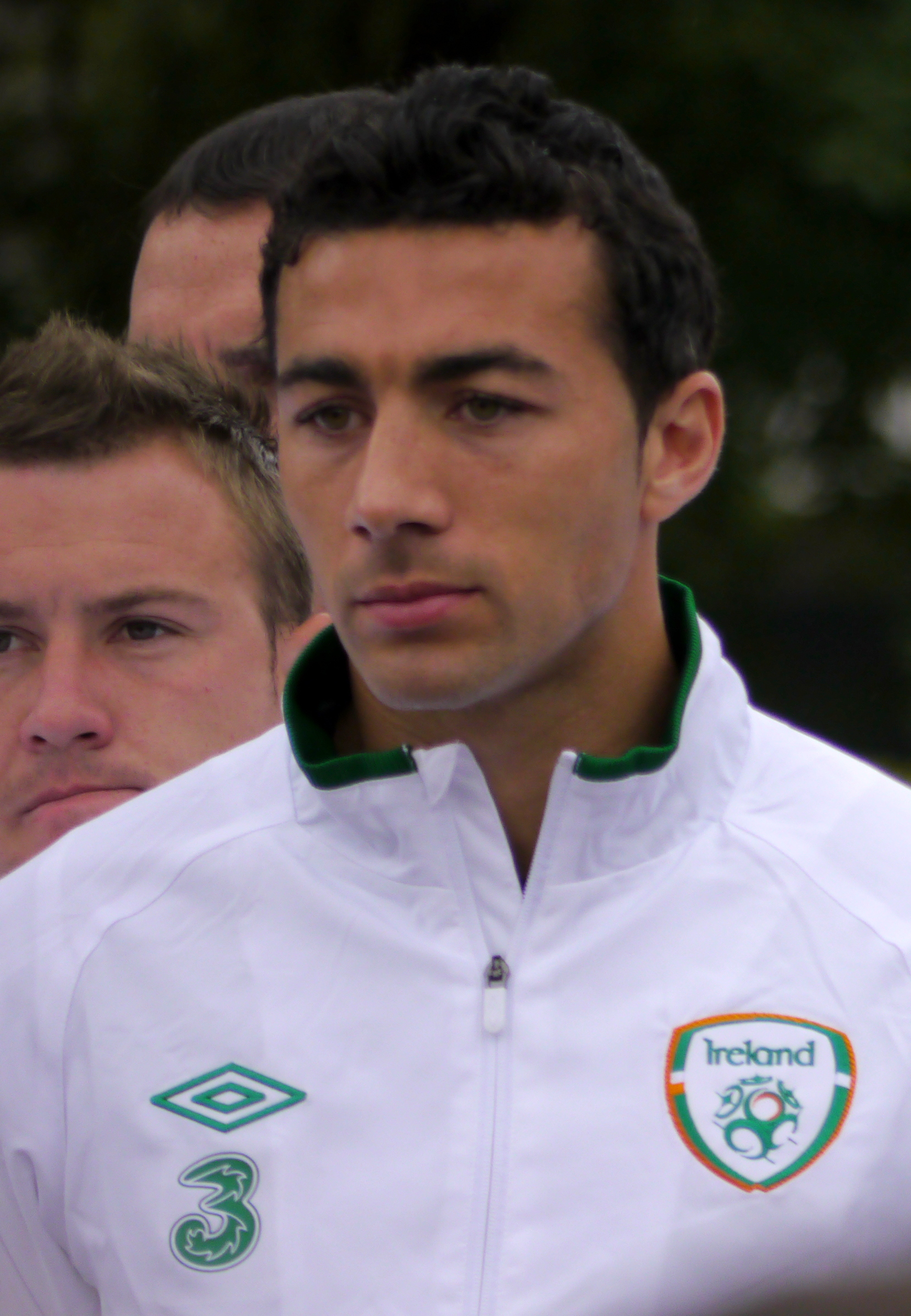
- Kelly with the Republic of Ireland national team before UEFA Euro 2012

Personal information
- Full name: Stephen Michael David Kelly
- Date of birth: 6 September 1983 (age 43)
- Place of birth: Dublin, Ireland
- Height: 1.84 m (6 ft 0 in)
- Position: Right back

Youth career
- Belvedere
- –2000: Tottenham Hotspur

Senior career*
Years	Team	Apps	(Gls)
2000–2006	Tottenham Hotspur	37	(2)
2003	→ Southend United (loan)	10	(0)
2003	→ Queens Park Rangers (loan)	7	(0)
2003	→ Watford (loan)	13	(0)
2006–2009	Birmingham City	79	(0)
2009	→ Stoke City (loan)	6	(0)
2009–2013	Fulham	44	(0)
2013–2015	Reading	46	(1)
2015–2017	Rotherham United	35	(0)
Total		277	(3)

International career
1999–2000	Republic of Ireland U16	12	(1)
2002–2003	Republic of Ireland U20		
2003–2005	Republic of Ireland U21	17	(0)
2006–2014	Republic of Ireland	39	(0)
- * Club domestic league appearances and goals

Stephen Michael David Kelly (born 6 September 1983) is an Irish former professional footballer who played as a right back. He was part of the team that secured the Republic of Ireland's qualification for UEFA Euro 2012.

Kelly began his professional career at Tottenham Hotspur and also played for Southend United, Queens Park Rangers, Watford, Birmingham City, Stoke City, Fulham and Reading before joining his final club, Rotherham United, in 2015. He was capped 39 times for the Republic of Ireland.

== Club career ==
=== Tottenham Hotspur ===
Kelly was born in Dublin, where he played football for Belvedere before joining Tottenham Hotspur through their youth programme. He was something of an understudy to Stephen Carr (who was subsequently transferred to Newcastle United) and then to Paul Stalteri. He made his Spurs first team debut in 2003 and then went on to make 37 Premier League appearances, scoring two league goals, against Birmingham City and Aston Villa.

=== Birmingham City ===
Birmingham City were reported to have agreed a deal to sign Kelly in January 2006 before Tottenham's shortage of defenders put a stop to the move. He did join Birmingham, however, on 28 June for an initial fee of £750,000, potentially rising to £1.25 million depending on his success with the club. He made 36 appearances in the 2006–07 Championship as Birmingham were promoted as runners-up.

Kelly was the only outfield player in the 2007–08 Premier League season to play every minute of every game for his club.

==== Stoke City (loan) ====
On 4 February 2009, Kelly joined Stoke City on loan from Birmingham City until the end of the 2008–09 season. Stoke City had to wait for 36 hours after the January transfer window shut for confirmation of the deal. Kelly made his Stoke debut in their next game, a 2–0 defeat to Sunderland, but picked up a hamstring injury while on international duty which kept him out of Stoke's next fixture.

=== Fulham ===
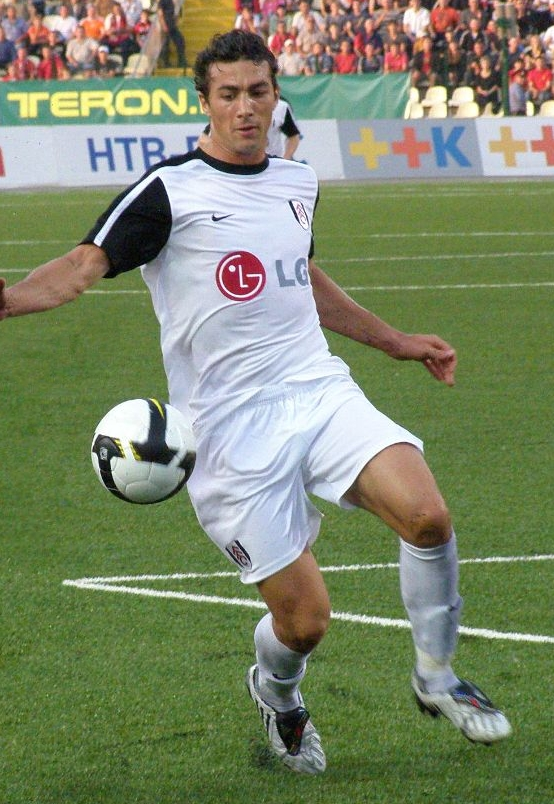
Kelly playing for Fulham in 2009

On 16 June 2009, Kelly signed a three-year contract with Fulham, making him the club's first signing of the 2009 summer window. He said he was delighted to join the Cottagers and was looking forward to representing the club in both the Premier League and Europa League. He helped Fulham reach the 2010 UEFA Europa League Final, playing in their memorable win against Juventus on the way, but he was left out of the squad for the final itself.

=== Reading ===
Kelly joined Reading on 11 January 2013, signing a 2 1/2-year contract. He made his debut on 19 January in Reading's 2–1 away win over Newcastle United at St James' Park, made his home debut a week later against Sheffield United in a 4–0 FA Cup win, and soon afterwards, stated that "regardless of what happens now and for the rest of the season, coming here is the best decision I've made in football". Kelly started every game in what remained of the season, and the team were relegated to the Championship.

He was allocated squad number 3 for the 2013–14 season. Kelly scored his first goal for Reading on 1 January 2014, a 95th-minute header from Royston Drenthe's free kick that gave his side a draw at home to Nottingham Forest.

Kelly left Reading at the end of the 2014–15 season, despite being offered a new contract by the club.

=== Rotherham United ===
On 19 November 2015, Kelly joined Championship club Rotherham United until the end of the 2015–16 season. He left the club at the end of the 2016–17 season.

== International career ==
Kelly won Irish caps at junior levels and became a member of the senior Irish national squad, making his debut versus Chile. He represented the Republic of Ireland Under-16 team at the 2000 UEFA European Under-16 Football Championship and the Under-20 team at the 2003 FIFA World Youth Championship.

On 29 March 2011, Kelly was named as Ireland captain for the friendly against Uruguay at the Aviva Stadium.

He was a squad member at UEFA Euro 2012 but saw no game time. Then, despite injuries to Richard Dunne and Sean St Ledger, manager Giovanni Trapattoni left him on the bench for the 6-1 home defeat to Germany in 2014 World Cup qualifying. Days later, Kelly had a training ground row with assistant manager Marco Tardelli, and was left so upset by the incident that he did not want to board the plane for the game against the Faroe Islands.

== Career statistics ==
=== Club ===
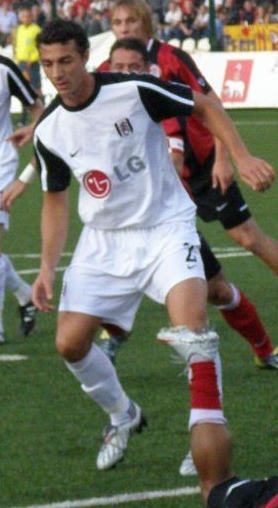
Kelly playing for Fulham in 2009

Appearances and goals by club, season and competition
Club	Season	League			FA Cup		League Cup		Other		Total	
Club	Season	Division	Apps	Goals	Apps	Goals	Apps	Goals	Apps	Goals	Apps	Goals
Tottenham Hotspur	2002–03	Premier League	0	0	0	0	0	0	—		0	0
Tottenham Hotspur	2003–04	Premier League	11	0	0	0	—		—		11	0
Tottenham Hotspur	2004–05	Premier League	17	2	5	0	1	0	—		23	2
Tottenham Hotspur	2005–06	Premier League	9	0	1	0	0	0	—		10	0
Tottenham Hotspur	Total		37	2	6	0	1	0	—		44	2
Southend United (loan)	2002–03	Third Division	10	0	—		—		—		10	0
Queens Park Rangers (loan)	2002–03	Second Division	7	0	—		—		2 (Note: Appearances in Second Division play-offs)	0	9	0
Watford (loan)	2003–04	First Division	13	0	—		—		—		13	0
Birmingham City	2006–07	Championship	36	0	1	0	4	0	—		41	0
Birmingham City	2007–08	Premier League	38	0	1	0	1	0	—		40	0
Birmingham City	2008–09	Championship	5	0	1	0	1	0	—		7	0
Birmingham City	Total		79	0	3	0	6	0	—		88	0
Stoke City (loan)	2008–09	Premier League	6	0	—		—		—		6	0
Fulham	2009–10	Premier League	8	0	3	0	1	0	10 (Note: Appearances in UEFA Europa League)	0	22	0
Fulham	2010–11	Premier League	10	0	0	0	2	0	—		12	0
Fulham	2011–12	Premier League	24	0	2	0	1	0	7	0	34	0
Fulham	2012–13	Premier League	2	0	0	0	1	0	—		3	0
Fulham	Total		44	0	5	0	5	0	17	0	71	0
Reading	2012–13	Premier League	16	0	2	0	—		—		18	0
Reading	2013–14	Championship	15	1	1	0	0	0	—		16	1
Reading	2014–15	Championship	15	0	3	0	0	0	—		18	0
Reading	Total		46	1	6	0	0	0	—		52	1
Rotherham United	2015–16	Championship	15	0	0	0	—		—		15	0
Rotherham United	2016–17	Championship	20	0	0	0	0	0	—		20	0
Rotherham United	Total		35	0	0	0	0	0	—		35	0
Career total			277	3	20	0	12	0	19	0	328	3

=== International ===
Appearances and goals by national team and year
National team	Year	Apps	Goals
Republic of Ireland	2006	3	0
Republic of Ireland	2007	6	0
Republic of Ireland	2008	3	0
Republic of Ireland	2009	3	0
Republic of Ireland	2010	5	0
Republic of Ireland	2011	9	0
Republic of Ireland	2012	3	0
Republic of Ireland	2013	5	0
Republic of Ireland	2014	2	0
Total		39	0

== Honours ==
Birmingham City

- Championship runner-up: 2006–07

Fulham

- UEFA Europa League runner-up: 2009–10

International

- Nations Cup: 2011
