= 2004–05 Tottenham Hotspur F.C. season =

English football club season

Tottenham Hotspur
2004–05 season
- Chairman: Daniel Levy
- Manager: Jacques Santini (until 5 November); Martin Jol (from 8 November)
- Premier League: 9th
- FA Cup: Sixth round
- League Cup: Quarter-finals
- Top goalscorer: League: Jermain Defoe (13); All: Jermain Defoe (22)
- Average home league attendance: 35,872
Home colours	Away colours	Third colours

The 2004–05 season was Tottenham Hotspur's 13th season in the Premier League and 27th successive season in the top division of the English football league system. The club also participated in the FA Cup and the Football League Cup.

== Season summary ==
Tottenham made a promising start under Jacques Santini and looked to be challenging for a place in Europe, but Santini resigned in November after only 12 games, citing personal reasons. He was replaced by his assistant coach Martin Jol, whose first match in charge saw arch-rivals Arsenal win a thrilling North London derby 5–4. Following the derby defeat results picked up and Tottenham were soon back amongst the race for a UEFA Cup spot, but a draw with Blackburn Rovers on the last day of the season saw their slim European hopes dashed. Nonetheless, good cup runs and the resurgence in the league under Jol gave Spurs fans hopes of a greater push for European football the next season.

== Players ==
=== First-team squad ===
Note: Flags indicate national team as defined under FIFA eligibility rules; some limited exceptions apply. Players may hold more than one non-FIFA nationality.

No.	Pos.	Nation	Player
1	GK	ENG	Paul Robinson
2	DF	MAR	Noureddine Naybet
4	MF	ENG	Sean Davis
5	DF	SCG	Goran Bunjevčević (Note: Bunjevčević was born in Karlovac, Yugoslavia (now Croatia), but also qualified to represent Serbia and Montenegro internationally and played for Serbia and Montenegro.)
7	MF	WAL	Simon Davies
8	MF	POR	Pedro Mendes
9	FW	MLI	Frédéric Kanouté (Note: Kanouté was born in Sainte-Foy-lès-Lyon, France, and has represented them at U-21 level, but also qualified to represent Mali internationally and made his international debut for Mali in January 2004.)
10	FW	IRL	Robbie Keane
11	MF	ENG	Michael Brown
12	FW	NED	Mounir El Hamdaoui (Note: El Hamdaoui was born in Rotterdam, Netherlands, and represented them at U-21 level, but also qualified to represent Morocco internationally and made his international debut for Morocco in February 2009.)
14	DF	SWE	Erik Edman
15	FW	EGY	Mido (on loan from Roma)
16	DF	SUI	Reto Ziegler
17	DF	FRA	Noé Pamarot
18	FW	ENG	Jermain Defoe
19	MF	IRL	Andy Reid
20	DF	ENG	Michael Dawson

No.	Pos.	Nation	Player
21	DF	BRA	Rodrigo Defendi
22	FW	ENG	Lee Barnard
23	MF	ENG	Michael Carrick
24	DF	CMR	Timothée Atouba
25	GK	HUN	Márton Fülöp
26	DF	ENG	Ledley King (captain)
27	MF	ENG	Rohan Ricketts
28	MF	IRL	Mark Yeates
29	DF	ENG	Philip Ifil
30	DF	ENG	Anthony Gardner
31	MF	ENG	Dean Marney
32	MF	ENG	Johnnie Jackson
34	DF	IRL	Stephen Kelly
35	DF	CZE	David Limberský (on loan from Viktoria Plzeň)
36	MF	ISL	Emil Hallfreðsson
37	GK	CZE	Radek Černý (on loan from Slavia Prague)
48	GK	ENG	Nicky Eyre

Last updated: 18 October 2019.
Source: footballsquads.co.uk

=== Left club during season ===
Note: Flags indicate national team as defined under FIFA eligibility rules; some limited exceptions apply. Players may hold more than one non-FIFA nationality.

No.	Pos.	Nation	Player
3	DF	ARG	Mauricio Taricco (to West Ham United)
6	DF	ENG	Dean Richards (retired)
12	DF	IRL	Gary Doherty (to Norwich City)
13	GK	USA	Kasey Keller (to Borussia Monchengladbach)
15	MF	ENG	Jamie Redknapp (to Southampton)

No.	Pos.	Nation	Player
19	DF	ENG	Calum Davenport (on loan to Southampton)
20	MF	POR	Edson Silva (Note: Edson was born in São Vicente, Cape Verde, but also qualified to represent Portugal internationally and represented them at U-20 level.) (to ADO Den Haag)
21	DF	RSA	Mbulelo Mabizela (to Orlando Pirates)
33	MF	NIR	Mark Hughes (to Oldham Athletic)
40	FW	ENG	Jamie Slabber (to Aldershot Town)

=== Reserve squad ===
Note: Flags indicate national team as defined under FIFA eligibility rules; some limited exceptions apply. Players may hold more than one non-FIFA nationality.

No.	Pos.	Nation	Player
42	GK	ENG	Robert Burch
43	DF	ENG	Marcel McKie
49	DF	AUS	Spase Dilevski

No.	Pos.	Nation	Player
52	MF	ENG	Jamie O'Hara
53	FW	ENG	Michael Malcolm

== Transfers ==
=== In ===
Date	Player	Old Club	Cost
14 May 2004	(England) Paul Robinson	(England) Leeds United	£1,400,000
28 May 2004	(Hungary) Márton Fülöp	(Hungary) MTK Budapest	£1,500,000
8 July 2004	(Portugal) Pedro Mendes	(Portugal) Porto	£2,000,000
9 July 2004	(England) Sean Davis	(England) Fulham	£3,000,000
31 July 2004	(Sweden) Erik Edman	(Netherlands) Heerenveen	£1,700,000
31 July 2004	(Portugal) Edson Silva	(Netherlands) PSV	Free
7 August 2004	(Cameroon) Timothée Atouba	(Switzerland) Basel	undisclosed
12 August 2004	(Morocco) Noureddine Naybet	(Spain) Deportivo La Coruña	£700,000
24 August 2004	(England) Michael Carrick	(England) West Ham United	£3,500,000
31 August 2004	(Switzerland) Reto Ziegler	(Switzerland) Grasshopper	Free
25 August 2004	(France) Noé Pamarot	(France) Nice	£1,700,000
5 January 2005	(Iceland) Emil Hallfreðsson	(Iceland) FH Hafnarfjordur	undisclosed
31 January 2005	(Republic of Ireland) Andy Reid	(England) Nottingham Forest	£4,000,0000.
31 January 2005	(England) Michael Dawson	(England) Nottingham Forest	£4,000,000

=== Out ===
- (Uruguay) Gus Poyet – retired, 12 May
- (Germany) Christian Ziege – released, 12 May (later joined (Germany) Borussia Mönchengladbach on 9 June)
- (England) Darren Anderton – released, 12 May (later joined (England) Birmingham City on 10 August)
- (Portugal) Hélder Postiga – (Portugal) Porto, 8 July, £5,000,000
- (Republic of Ireland) Stephen Carr – (England) Newcastle United, 10 August, £2,000,000
- (Republic of Ireland) Gary Doherty – (England) Norwich City, 20 August, undisclosed
- (South Africa) Mbulelo Mabizela – released, 25 October (later joined (South Africa) Orlando Pirates on 12 January)
- (Argentina) Mauricio Taricco – (England) West Ham United, 19 November, free
- (England) Jamie Redknapp – (England) Southampton, 4 January, free
- (United States) Kasey Keller – (Germany) Borussia Mönchengladbach, 15 January, free
- (Portugal) Edson Silva – (Netherlands) ADO Den Haag, 31 January, free
- (Northern Ireland) Mark Hughes – (England) Oldham Athletic, 15 February, free
- (England) Dean Richards – retired, 21 March
- (England) Jamie Slabber – (England) Aldershot Town free, 30 March
- (Canada) Lars Hirschfeld – (England) Leicester City, free , 23 April

=== Loan in ===
- (Czech Republic) Radek Černý – (Czech Republic) Slavia Prague
- (Egypt) Mido – (Italy) Roma, 26 January, 18 months

=== Loan out ===
- (United States) Kasey Keller – (England) Southampton, 12 November, one month
- (England) Calum Davenport – (England) Southampton, 3 January, season-long
- (Canada) Lars Hirschfeld – (Scotland) Dundee United, August

Transfers in: ▼£20,300,000
Transfers out: ▲£7,000,000
Overall spending: ▼£13,300,000

== Trialists ==
- (Portugal) Edson Silva – (Netherlands) PSV (successful)
- (Ivory Coast) Dagui Bakari (Note: Bakari was born in Paris, France, but also qualified to represent the Ivory Coast internationally and made his international debut for Ivory Coast in 2003.) – (France) Lens (unsuccessful)
- (Hungary) Márton Fülöp – (Hungary) MTK (successful)

== Competitions ==
Competition	Record						
Competition	P	W	D	L	GF	GA	Win %
Premier League	38	14	10	14	47	41	36.84
FA Cup	6	3	2	1	10	5	50.00
League Cup	4	3	1	0	14	4	75.00
Total	48	20	13	15	71	50	41.67

== Results ==
=== Premier League ===
14 August 2004 1	Tottenham Hotspur	1–1	Liverpool	Haringey, London
	Defoe 71'	Report	Cissé 38'	Stadium: White Hart Lane; Attendance: 35,105; Referee: Dermot Gallagher

21 August 2004 2	Newcastle United	0–1	Tottenham Hotspur	Newcastle upon Tyne
		Report	Atouba 51'	Stadium: St James' Park; Attendance: 52,185; Referee: Mike Dean

25 August 2004 3	West Bromwich Albion	1–1	Tottenham Hotspur	West Bromwich
	Gera 3'	Report	Defoe 34'	Stadium: The Hawthorns; Attendance: 27,191; Referee: Barry Knight

28 August 2004 4	Tottenham Hotspur	1–0	Birmingham City	Haringey, London
	Defoe 35'	Report		Stadium: White Hart Lane; Attendance: 35,290; Referee: Mark Clattenburg

12 September 2004 5	Tottenham Hotspur	0–0	Norwich City	Haringey, London
		Report		Stadium: White Hart Lane; Attendance: 36,095; Referee: Howard Webb

19 September 2004 6	Chelsea	0–0	Tottenham Hotspur	London
		Report		Stadium: Stamford Bridge; Attendance: 42,246; Referee: Mike Riley

25 September 2004 7	Tottenham Hotspur	0–1	Manchester United	Haringey, London
		Report	van Nistelrooy 42' (pen.)	Stadium: White Hart Lane; Attendance: 36,103; Referee: Peter Walton

2 October 2004 8	Everton	0–1	Tottenham Hotspur	Merseyside
		Report	Pamarot 53'	Stadium: Goodison Park; Attendance: 38,264; Referee: Graham Poll

18 October 2004 9	Portsmouth	1–0	Tottenham Hotspur	Portsmouth
	Yakubu 63'	Report		Stadium: Fratton Park; Attendance: 20,121; Referee: Uriah Rennie

23 October 2004 10	Tottenham Hotspur	1–2	Bolton Wanderers	Haringey, London
	Keane 41'	Report	Jaïdi 11'; Pedersen 75'	Stadium: White Hart Lane; Attendance: 36,025; Referee: Chris Foy

30 October 2004 11	Fulham	2–0	Tottenham Hotspur	London
	Boa Morte 33'; Cole 61'	Report		Stadium: Craven Cottage; Attendance: 21,317; Referee: Alan Wiley

6 November 2004 12	Tottenham Hotspur	2–3	Charlton Athletic	Haringey, London
	Keane 69' (pen.); Defoe 79'	Report	Bartlett 17', 39'; Thomas 50'	Stadium: White Hart Lane; Attendance: 35,423; Referee: Neale Barry

13 November 2004 13	Tottenham Hotspur	4–5	Arsenal	Haringey, London
	Naybet 37'; Defoe 61'; King 74'; Kanouté 88'	Report	Henry 45'; Lauren 55' (pen.); Vieira 60'; Ljungberg 69'; Pires 81'	Stadium: White Hart Lane; Attendance: 36,095; Referee: Steve Bennett

22 November 2004 14	Aston Villa	1–0	Tottenham Hotspur	Birmingham
	Solano 57'	Report		Stadium: Villa Park; Attendance: 35,702; Referee: Chris Foy

28 November 2004 15	Tottenham Hotspur	2–0	Middlesbrough	Haringey, London
	Defoe 49'; Kanouté 76'	Report		Stadium: White Hart Lane; Attendance: 35,772; Referee: Phil Dowd

4 December 2004 16	Blackburn Rovers	0–1	Tottenham Hotspur	Blackburn
		Report	Keane 56'	Stadium: Ewood Park; Attendance: 22,182; Referee: Mike Dean

11 December 2004 17	Manchester City	0–1	Tottenham Hotspur	Manchester, Greater Manchester
		Report	Kanouté 57'	Stadium: City of Manchester Stadium; Attendance: 45,805; Referee: Dermot Gallagher

18 December 2004 18	Tottenham Hotspur	5–1	Southampton	Haringey, London
	Defoe 8', 27', 61'; Kanouté 44'; Keane 88'	Report	Crouch 47'	Stadium: White Hart Lane; Attendance: 36,054; Referee: Phil Dowd

26 December 2004 19	Norwich City	0–2	Tottenham Hotspur	Norwich
		Report	Keane 73'; Brown 77'	Stadium: Carrow Road; Attendance: 24,508; Referee: Mike Riley

28 December 2004 20	Tottenham Hotspur	1–1	Crystal Palace	Haringey, London
	Defoe 54'	Report	Johnson 79'	Stadium: White Hart Lane; Attendance: 36,100; Referee: Uriah Rennie

1 January 2005 21	Tottenham Hotspur	5–2	Everton	Haringey, London
	Marney 16', 80'; Ziegler 27'; Mendes 59'; Keane 68'	Report	Cahill 40'; McFadden 87'	Stadium: White Hart Lane; Attendance: 36,102; Referee: Steve Dunn

4 January 2005 22	Manchester United	0–0	Tottenham Hotspur	Manchester
		Report		Stadium: Old Trafford; Attendance: 67,962; Referee: Mark Clattenburg

15 January 2005 23	Tottenham Hotspur	0–2	Chelsea	Haringey, London
		Report	Lampard 39' (pen.), 90'	Stadium: White Hart Lane; Attendance: 36,105; Referee: Graham Poll

22 January 2005 24	Crystal Palace	3–0	Tottenham Hotspur	London
	Leigertwood 66'; Granville 70'; Johnson 77' (pen.)	Report		Stadium: Craven Cottage; Attendance: 23,723; Referee: Chris Foy

1 February 2005 25	Bolton Wanderers	3–1	Tottenham Hotspur	Bolton
	Diouf 49' (pen.); Ben Haim 86'; Davies 87'	Report	Defoe 66'	Stadium: Reebok Stadium; Attendance: 24,780; Referee: Mike Dean

5 February 2005 26	Tottenham Hotspur	3–1	Portsmouth	Haringey, London
	Mido 34', 57'; Keane 83'	Report	Kamara 28'	Stadium: White Hart Lane; Attendance: 36,105; Referee: Steve Dunn

26 February 2005 27	Tottenham Hotspur	2–0	Fulham	Haringey, London
	Kanouté 78'; Keane 90'	Report		Stadium: White Hart Lane; Attendance: 35,885; Referee: Neale Barry

5 March 2005 28	Southampton	1–0	Tottenham Hotspur	Southampton
	Quashie 51'	Report		Stadium: St Mary's Stadium; Attendance: 31,903; Referee: Peter Walton

16 March 2005 29	Charlton Athletic	2–0	Tottenham Hotspur	London
	Thomas 4'; Murphy 85'	Report		Stadium: The Valley; Attendance: 26,870; Referee: Chris Foy

19 March 2005 30	Tottenham Hotspur	2–1	Manchester City	Haringey, London
	Defoe 16'; Keane 84'	Report	Reyna 44'	Stadium: White Hart Lane; Attendance: 35,681; Referee: Barry Knight

2 April 2005 31	Birmingham City	1–1	Tottenham Hotspur	Birmingham
	Carter 66'	Report	Kelly 59'	Stadium: St Andrew's; Attendance: 29,304; Referee: Howard Webb

10 April 2005 32	Tottenham Hotspur	1–0	Newcastle United	Haringey, London
	Defoe 42'	Report		Stadium: White Hart Lane; Attendance: 35,885; Referee: Steve Bennett

16 April 2005 33	Liverpool	2–2	Tottenham Hotspur	Liverpool
	Luis García 44'; Hyypiä 63'	Report	Edman 12'; Keane 55'	Stadium: Anfield; Attendance: 44,029; Referee: Mark Halsey

20 April 2005 34	Tottenham Hotspur	1–1	West Bromwich Albion	Haringey, London
	Keane 52'	Report	Gera 24'	Stadium: White Hart Lane; Attendance: 35,885; Referee: Chris Foy

25 April 2005 35	Arsenal	1–0	Tottenham Hotspur	London
	Reyes 22'	Report		Stadium: Highbury; Attendance: 38,147; Referee: Mike Riley

1 May 2005 36	Tottenham Hotspur	5–1	Aston Villa	Haringey, London
	Kanouté 6', 27'; King 19'; Reid 67'; Kelly 90'	Report	Barry 45' (pen.)	Stadium: White Hart Lane; Attendance: 36,078; Referee: Mark Clattenburg

7 May 2005 37	Middlesbrough	1–0	Tottenham Hotspur	Middlesbrough
	Boateng 11'	Report		Stadium: Riverside Stadium; Attendance: 34,766; Referee: Dermot Gallagher

15 May 2005 38	Tottenham Hotspur	0–0	Blackburn Rovers	Haringey, London
		Report		Stadium: White Hart Lane; Attendance: 35,797; Referee: Alan Wiley

=== FA Cup ===
8 January 2005 3rd round	Tottenham Hotspur	2–1	Brighton & Hove Albion	Haringey, London
	King 40'; Keane 83'	Report	Carpenter 48'	Stadium: White Hart Lane; Attendance: 36,094; Referee: Alan Wiley

29 January 2005 4th round	West Bromwich Albion	1–1	Tottenham Hotspur	West Bromwich
	Earnshaw 17'	Report	Defoe 31' (pen.)	Stadium: The Hawthorns; Attendance: 22,441; Referee: Mark Halsey

12 February 2005 4th round (R)	Tottenham Hotspur	3–1	West Bromwich Albion	Haringey, London
	Keane 45' (pen.); Defoe 50', 55'	Report	Kanu 12'	Stadium: White Hart Lane; Attendance: 27,860; Referee: Rob Styles

20 February 2005 5th round	Tottenham Hotspur	1–1	Nottingham Forest	Haringey, London
	Defoe 45'	Report	Taylor 56'	Stadium: White Hart Lane; Attendance: 35,640; Referee: Steve Bennett

2 March 2005 5th round (R)	Nottingham Forest	0–3	Tottenham Hotspur	Nottingham
		Report	Pamarot 60'; Keane 72'; Mido 90'	Stadium: City Ground; Attendance: 28,062; Referee: Mark Clattenburg

13 March 2005 Quarter-finals	Newcastle United	1–0	Tottenham Hotspur	Newcastle upon Tyne
	Kluivert 5'	Report		Stadium: St James' Park; Attendance: 51,307; Referee: Rob Styles

=== League Cup ===
22 September 2004 2nd round	Oldham Athletic	0–6	Tottenham Hotspur	Oldham
		Report	Kanouté 37', 90'; Keane 64'; Defoe 71'; Bunjevčević 87'; Gardner 90'	Stadium: Boundary Park; Attendance: 8,548; Referee: Richard Beeby

27 October 2004 3rd round	Bolton Wanderers	3–4 (a.e.t.)	Tottenham Hotspur	Bolton
	King 27' (o.g.); Okocha 75' (pen.); Ferdinand 105'	Report	Defoe 44', 103'; Bunjevčević 84'; Brown 95'	Stadium: Reebok Stadium; Attendance: 18,037; Referee: Mike Dean

9 November 2004 4th round	Burnley	0–3	Tottenham Hotspur	Burnley
		Report	Keane 31', 52'; Defoe 58'	Stadium: Turf Moor; Attendance: 10,639; Referee: Graham Poll

1 December 2004 Quarter-finals	Tottenham Hotspur	1–1 (a.e.t.) (3–4 p)	Liverpool	Haringey, London
	Defoe 108'	Report	Sinama Pongolle 117' (pen.)	Stadium: White Hart Lane; Attendance: 36,100; Referee: Neale Barry
	Penalties
	Defoe (penalty scored); Carrick (penalty scored); Kanouté (penalty missed); Brown (penalty missed); Ziegler (penalty scored)		Henchoz (penalty scored); Partridge (penalty scored); Potter (penalty missed); Welsh (penalty scored); Sinama Pongolle (penalty scored)

== Final league table ==
Pos	Team	Pld	W	D	L	GF	GA	GD	Pts	Qualification or relegation
7	Middlesbrough	38	14	13	11	53	46	+7	55	Qualification for the UEFA Cup first round (Note: Since the finalists of the FA Cup, Arsenal and Manchester United, as well as Chelsea, who won the 2004–05 Football League Cup, were qualified for the Champions League, and the fifth-placed team (Liverpool) were moved to the Champions League, the sixth and seventh-placed teams in the Premier League were rewarded entry to the UEFA Cup.)
8	Manchester City	38	13	13	12	47	39	+8	52	
9	Tottenham Hotspur	38	14	10	14	47	41	+6	52	
10	Aston Villa	38	12	11	15	45	52	−7	47	
11	Charlton Athletic	38	12	10	16	42	58	−16	46	

Rules for classification: 1) points; 2) goal difference; 3) number of goals scored.

== Statistics ==
=== Appearances and goals ===
Up to end of season

No.	Pos	Nat	Player	Total		Premier League		FA Cup		League Cup	
No.	Pos	Nat	Player	Apps	Goals	Apps	Goals	Apps	Goals	Apps	Goals
Goalkeepers
1	GK	(England) ENG	Paul Robinson	44	0	36	0	6	0	2	0
37	GK	(Czech Republic) CZE	Radek Černý	3	0	2+1	0	0	0	0	0
Defenders
2	DF	(Morocco) MAR	Noureddine Naybet	31	1	27	1	2	0	2	0
5	DF	(Serbia and Montenegro) SCG	Goran Bunjevčević	5	2	2+1	0	0	0	2	2
14	DF	(Sweden) SWE	Erik Edman	31	1	28	1	2+1	0	0	0
16	DF	(Switzerland) SUI	Reto Ziegler	31	1	12+11	1	5	0	3	0
17	DF	(France) FRA	Noé Pamarot	28	2	23	1	2	1	3	0
20	DF	(England) ENG	Michael Dawson	5	0	5	0	0	0	0	0
24	DF	(Cameroon) CMR	Timothée Atouba	24	1	15+3	1	5	0	1	0
26	DF	(England) ENG	Ledley King	47	3	38	2	5	1	4	0
29	DF	(England) ENG	Philip Ifil	3	0	2	0	0	0	0+1	0
30	DF	(England) ENG	Anthony Gardner	24	1	8+9	0	4+1	0	2	1
34	DF	(Republic of Ireland) IRL	Stephen Kelly	23	2	13+4	2	5	0	1	0
Midfielders
4	MF	(England) ENG	Sean Davis	16	0	11+4	0	0	0	1	0
7	MF	(Wales) WAL	Simon Davies	29	0	17+4	0	4+1	0	2+1	0
8	MF	(Portugal) POR	Pedro Mendes	30	1	22+2	1	2	0	2+2	0
11	MF	(England) ENG	Michael Brown	34	2	20+4	1	6	0	3+1	1
19	MF	(Republic of Ireland) IRL	Andy Reid	13	1	13	1	0	0	0	0
23	MF	(England) ENG	Michael Carrick	38	0	26+3	0	5+1	0	2+1	0
27	MF	(England) ENG	Rohan Ricketts	8	0	5+1	0	0	0	1+1	0
28	MF	(Republic of Ireland) IRL	Mark Yeates	3	0	0+2	0	0+1	0	0	0
31	MF	(England) ENG	Dean Marney	8	2	3+2	2	0+3	0	0	0
32	MF	(England) ENG	Johnnie Jackson	9	0	3+5	0	0	0	1	0
Forwards
9	FW	(Mali) MLI	Frédéric Kanouté	41	9	22+10	7	5	0	3+1	2
10	FW	(Republic of Ireland) IRL	Robbie Keane	45	17	23+12	11	3+3	3	3+1	3
15	FW	(Egypt) EGY	Mido	11	3	4+5	2	0+2	1	0	0
18	FW	(England) ENG	Jermain Defoe	44	22	28+7	13	5	4	2+2	5
Players transferred out during the season
12	DF	(Republic of Ireland) IRL	Gary Doherty	1	0	0+1	0	0	0	0	0
13	GK	(United States) USA	Kasey Keller	2	0	0	0	0	0	2	0
15	MF	(England) ENG	Jamie Redknapp	15	0	9+5	0	0	0	1	0
19	DF	(England) ENG	Calum Davenport	1	0	0+1	0	0	0	0	0
21	DF	(South Africa) RSA	Mbulelo Mabizela	2	0	1	0	0	0	1	0

=== Goal scorers ===
Last updated: 26 July 2020.
Source: premierleague.com

The list is sorted by shirt number when total goals are equal.

Rnk	Pos	No.	Player	Premier League	FA Cup	EFL Cup	Total
1	FW	18	(England) Jermain Defoe	13	4	5	22
2	FW	10	(Republic of Ireland) Robbie Keane	11	3	3	17
3	FW	9	(Mali) Frédéric Kanouté	7	0	2	9
4	FW	15	(Egypt) Mido	2	1	0	3
4	DF	26	(England) Ledley King	2	1	0	3
6	DF	5	(Serbia and Montenegro) Goran Bunjevčević	0	0	2	2
6	MF	11	(England) Michael Brown	1	0	1	2
6	DF	17	(France) Noé Pamarot	1	1	0	2
6	MF	31	(England) Dean Marney	2	0	0	2
6	DF	34	(Republic of Ireland) Stephen Kelly	2	0	0	2
11	DF	2	(Morocco) Noureddine Naybet	1	0	0	1
11	MF	8	(Portugal) Pedro Mendes	1	0	0	1
11	DF	14	(Sweden) Erik Edman	1	0	0	1
11	DF	16	(Switzerland) Reto Ziegler	1	0	0	1
11	MF	19	(Republic of Ireland) Andy Reid	1	0	0	1
11	DF	24	(Cameroon) Timothée Atouba	1	0	0	1
11	DF	30	(England) Anthony Gardner	0	0	1	1
TOTALS				47	10	14	71

=== Clean sheets ===
Last updated: 26 July 2020.
Source: premierleague.com

The list is sorted by shirt number when total clean sheets are equal.

Rnk	No.	Player	Premier League	FA Cup	EFL Cup	Total
1	1	(England) Paul Robinson	12	1	1	14
2	37	(Czech Republic) Radek Černý	2	0	0	2
3	13	(United States) Kasey Keller	0	0	1	1
TOTALS			14	1	2	17
