= David Howland =

Northern Irish footballer (born 1986)

Personal information
- Full name: David Howland
- Date of birth: 17 September 1986 (age 40)
- Place of birth: Ballynahinch, Northern Ireland
- Height: 5 ft 11 in (1.80 m)
- Position: Midfielder

Youth career
- 2002–2004: Birmingham City

Senior career*
Years	Team	Apps	(Gls)
2004–2008	Birmingham City	0	(0)
2008	→ Port Vale (loan)	17	(1)
2008–2010	Port Vale	45	(2)
2010–2016	Glentoran	95	(12)
Total		157	(15)

International career
2006–2008	Northern Ireland U21	4	(0)
- * Club domestic league appearances and goals

David Howland (born 17 September 1986) is a Northern Irish former professional footballer who played as a midfielder. He scored 17 goals in 171 league and cup appearances in an eleven-year career in professional and semi-professional football in England and Northern Ireland.

A Northern Ireland under-21 international, he started his career at Birmingham City. In January 2008, he was loaned out to Port Vale and joined the club permanently at the end of the season. He was released by Port Vale in the summer of 2010, at which point he signed with Glentoran. He helped the club win the Irish Cup in 2013 before he retired due to an injury in August 2016.

== Club career ==
=== Birmingham City ===
Howland was born in Ballynahinch, County Down, and joined Birmingham City's Academy in 2002. He signed his first one-year professional contract in 2005, which was renewed for another year. He was allocated a first-team squad number for the first time during the 2006–07 season and signed a further year's contract before the 2007–08 season. A central midfielder, he played regularly for Birmingham's reserve team but did not make an appearance for the first team.

He was an unused substitute in the League Cup fourth-round tie against Blackburn Rovers in September 2007 in unusual circumstances. Birmingham had selected the 15-year-old Jordon Mutch, having obtained confirmation from the Premier League that it was within the rules for a boy of that age to play, but were informed less than two hours before kick-off that due to the Football Association's child protection rules, Mutch would not be eligible. Special dispensation was granted for Howland, who had not been assigned a squad number for the 2007–08 season, to take his place on the bench wearing a numberless shirt.

=== Port Vale ===
In January 2008, he joined Port Vale of League One on loan for the remainder of the season and made his debut in the Football League on 26 January 2008, against AFC Bournemouth. At the end of the season, he was released by Birmingham, but his performance while on loan at Port Vale was sufficient to earn him a two-year permanent deal.

He was among the few Vale players to hit 40 games in the 2008–09 season. He enjoyed his time under Dean Glover, especially in games with Glover's five-man midfield tactic. However, he was transfer-listed by new manager Micky Adams in August 2009, along with five others, having failed to impress in the pre-season. After a month on the transfer list, he was the only one of the six to have received no inquiries from any clubs, which came as a surprise to many Vale fans. He returned to the Vale first team in mid-September after impressing in training, though he remained transfer-listed. In April 2010, he learned that he would not be offered a new contract by manager Micky Adams.

=== Glentoran ===
In September 2010, Howland left England for Belfast, signing a season-long contract with IFA Premiership club Glentoran. He made his debut in the televised Sky Sports match at home to Linfield. He was utilised in the playmaker role in the heart of the midfield. The "Glens" finished in third place in 2010–11, qualifying for the UEFA Europa League. In January 2011, he signed a contract to keep him at the club until 2014. Glentoran then finished sixth in 2011–12. They finished fourth in 2012–13 and qualified for the Europa League. Glentoran also won the Irish Cup, and Howland played in the 3–1 final victory over Cliftonville. Howland also featured in the club's Europa League qualification defeat to Icelandic club KR. The "Glens" finished the 2013–14 season in fifth place, though Howland missed much of the campaign after injuring cartilage in his knee. He featured ten times in the 2014–15 campaign and just once in the 2015–16 season before he announced his retirement in August 2016, owing to a long-standing injury.

== International career ==
Howland represented Northern Ireland at junior levels and was first selected for the under-21 squad in February 2006. He won four caps at under-21 level.

== Physiotherapy career ==
Howland graduated as a physiotherapist and secured a job at the Crewe Alexandra Academy in 2016.

== Career statistics ==
Appearances and goals by club, season and competition
Club	Season	League			National cup (Note: Includes FA Cup, Irish Cup)		League cup (Note: Includes Football League Cup, Northern Ireland Football League Cup)		Other		Total	
Club	Season	Division	Apps	Goals	Apps	Goals	Apps	Goals	Apps	Goals	Apps	Goals
Birmingham City	2005–06	Premier League	0	0	0	0	0	0	0	0	0	0
Birmingham City	2006–07	Championship	0	0	0	0	0	0	—		0	0
Birmingham City	2007–08	Premier League	0	0	0	0	0	0	0	0	0	0
Birmingham City	Total		0	0	0	0	0	0	0	0	0	0
Port Vale	2007–08	League One	17	1	—		—		—		17	1
Port Vale	2008–09	League Two	40	2	1	1	0	0	0	0	41	3
Port Vale	2009–10	League Two	5	0	1	0	0	0	1 (Note: Appearance(s) in the EFL Trophy.)	0	7	0
Port Vale	Total		62	3	2	1	0	0	1	0	65	4
Glentoran	2010–11	NIFL Premiership	20	2	0	0	3	0	0	0	23	2
Glentoran	2011–12	NIFL Premiership	26	4	0	0	2	0	0	0	28	4
Glentoran	2012–13	NIFL Premiership	29	5	4	1	2	0	0	0	35	6
Glentoran	2013–14	NIFL Premiership	9	1	0	0	0	0	0	0	9	1
Glentoran	2014–15	NIFL Premiership	10	0	0	0	0	0	0	0	10	0
Glentoran	2015–16	NIFL Premiership	1	0	0	0	0	0	0	0	1	0
Glentoran	Total		95	12	4	1	7	0	0	0	106	13
Career total			157	15	6	2	7	0	1	0	171	17

== Honours ==
Glentoran

- Irish Cup: 2012–13
