= Jared Wilson (footballer) =

English footballer (born 1989)

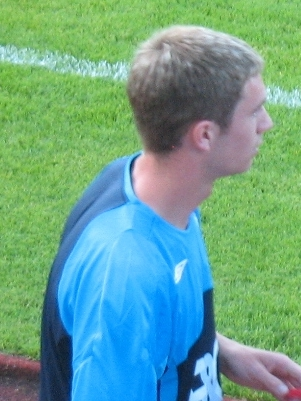
- Wilson in 2009 pre-season

Personal information
- Full name: Jared Andrew Wilson
- Date of birth: 24 January 1989 (age 37)
- Place of birth: Cheltenham, England
- Height: 5 ft 8 in (1.73 m)
- Position: Full back

Youth career
- 2001–2008: Birmingham City

Senior career*
Years	Team	Apps	(Gls)
2008–2010	Birmingham City	1	(0)
2009	→ Chesterfield (loan)	16	(0)
2010	Redditch United	1	(0)
2011	Worcester City	5	(0)
2011–2012	Cirencester Town	13	(0)
2012–2016	Evesham United	133	(9)
2016	Bishop's Cleeve Res	1	(0)
- * Club domestic league appearances and goals as of 16 September 2016

Jared Andrew Wilson (born 24 January 1989) is an English footballer who plays as a full back. He previously played in the Football League for Birmingham City and Chesterfield, and in non-League football for Redditch United, Worcester City, Cirencester Town and Evesham United.

== Club career ==
Wilson, from Cheltenham, Gloucestershire, played in the under-18 side that reached the quarter-final of the 2007 FA Youth Cup. Before the 2007–08 season he signed his first one-year professional contract. He made ten appearances for the reserve team and five for the Academy team that season, after which he was given a further one-year contract.

In the build-up to the 2008–09 season, Wilson was part of the first-team squad and, together with fellow youngsters Jordon Mutch and Sone Aluko, went on the club's pre-season tour to Austria. Manager Alex McLeish described him as "an energetic full-back ... one we think could make a career in football". He was given a squad number and included among the substitutes for the Championship match against Crystal Palace in October 2008, but remained unused. A week later, called into the matchday squad at the last minute when Garry O'Connor was injured during the pre-match warm-up, he made his first-team debut as a 12th-minute replacement for the injured Stuart Parnaby in a 1–0 defeat at Queens Park Rangers.

Wilson joined Chesterfield of Football League Two in February 2009 on loan for the remainder of the 2008–09 season. He appeared regularly for the club, and in June 2009 signed a year's extension to his Birmingham contract. In May 2010 the club announced that he would be released when his contract expired at the end of June.

Wilson then spent pre-season on trial with both Cheltenham Town and Bishop's Cleeve but failed to land a deal. He signed for Redditch United in October, but made only one substitute appearance in the Conference North before dislocating a shoulder in a Birmingham Senior Cup tie. In the summer of 2011, Wilson joined Worcester City of the Conference North, and appear five times before leaving for Southern League Premier Division club Cirencester Town.

In January 2012, Wilson left Cirencester for Evesham United, also playing in the Southern League Premier Division. Wilson suffered relegation with Evesham at the end of the 2011–12 season but re-signed to remain with the club for the 2012–13 season where they would compete in the Southern League South & West Division. He stayed with the club until 2016, when he joined Bishop's Cleeve's reserves as player-coach.
