= Rafael Schmitz =

Brazilian footballer (born 1980)

Personal information
- Full name: Rafael Schmitz
- Date of birth: 17 December 1980 (age 45)
- Place of birth: Blumenau, Brazil
- Height: 1.82 m (5 ft 11 1/2 in)
- Position: Defender

Youth career
- 1990–1993: BEC
- 1994: Atlético-PR
- 1995–1997: Tupi-SC
- 1997–1999: Santos

Senior career*
Years	Team	Apps	(Gls)
1999–2001	Malutrom		
2001–2008	Lille	99	(2)
2004	→ Krylya Sovetov Samara (loan)	9	(0)
2007–2008	→ Birmingham City (loan)	15	(0)
2008–2012	Valenciennes	46	(2)
2012–2013	Atlético Paranaense	2	(0)
2018	Metropolitano	0	(0)
- * Club domestic league appearances and goals as of 22 January 2019

Rafael Schmitz (born 17 December 1980) is a Brazilian retired footballer who played as a centre-back.

== Career ==
Schmitz started his professional career at Malutrom, winning the 2000 Brazilian 3rd division. In 2001, he joined Lille OSC, where he spent six seasons and for whom he played 99 Ligue 1 games and appeared in the Champions League and UEFA Cup. He joined Birmingham City on loan for the 2007–08 season on July 6, 2007. He made his Birmingham debut as a very late substitute on September 15, 2007 against Bolton Wanderers, and his first start on October 20, 2007 against Manchester City in place of the injured Johan Djourou. He returned to Lille following Birmingham's relegation at the end of the season.

On June 23, 2008, Schmitz signed a three-year contract with Valenciennes, where he played for four years before returning to Brazil and signing for Atlético Paranaense. After being overlooked at the club, he was about to sign for ABC on September, only for his club to decide against the deal in the last minute after Atlético needed defensive cover due to an injury suffered by Naldo. However, he only played two matches for Atlético Paranaense and left the club in 2013.

In 2018, Schmitz decided to return to professional football and trained with Metropolitano, a club based in his hometown. On 11 May 2018, he signed for the club to play the 2018 Campeonato Catarinense Série B. After achieving promotion to 2019 Campeonato Catarinense, he left the club.

Schmitz holds both Brazilian and French nationalities.

== Honours ==
Lille

- UEFA Intertoto Cup: 2004
