= Yamoudou Camara =

French footballer (born 1987)

Personal information
- Date of birth: 12 August 1987 (age 39)
- Place of birth: Sèvres, France
- Height: 1.87 m (6 ft 2 in)
- Position: Centre-back

Senior career*
Years	Team	Apps	(Gls)
2008–2010	AS Nancy B	63	(0)
2010	FK Ekranas	6	(0)
2011	Unirea Alba Iulia	22	(0)
2012	Politehnica Iaşi	14	(1)
- * Club domestic league appearances and goals

Yamoudou Camara (born 12 August 1987) is a French former professional footballer who played as a centre-back.

== Career ==
While he never made his league debut for Nancy, Camara made two cup appearances in the 2007–08 season.

In July 2008 Camara joined Birmingham City on trial during their pre-season tour, training with the club and making a substitute appearance against Czech side Viktoria Plzeň.

In September 2010 he was released by Nancy and on 3 July he joined Lithuanian club FK Ekranas. In December 2010 he was released by FK Ekranas and signed with Unirea Alba Iulia.

In February 2012 Camara signed with Liga II club Politehnica Iaşi. After half a year at Politehnica, Camara helped his team gain promotion to the Liga I.
