= 2016–17 Newport County A.F.C. season =

Welsh association football club season

Newport County
2016–17 season
- Owner: Newport County AFC Supporters Trust
- Chairman: Malcolm Temple & Gavin Foxall
- Manager: Warren Feeney until 28 September 2016; Sean McCarthy & James Bittner (caretaker managers) from 28 September 2016 to 9 October 2016; Graham Westley from 10 October 2016 to 9 March 2017; Michael Flynn (caretaker manager) from 9 March 2017
- Stadium: Rodney Parade
- League Two: 22nd
- FA Cup: Second round
- EFL Cup: First round
- EFL Trophy: Southern Group B
- Top goalscorer: League: Rhys Healey; Sean Rigg; Ryan Bird (6 each); All: Rhys Healey; Josh Sheehan (7 each)
- Highest home attendance: 7,326 v Notts County (6 May 2017)
- Lowest home attendance: 368 v AFC Wimbledon (8 November 2016) EFL Trophy Southern Group B
- Average home league attendance: 2,854
Home colours	Away colours	Third colours

The 2016–17 season was Newport County's fourth consecutive season in Football League Two, 64th season in the Football League and 96th season of league football overall. The season saw Newport achieve a second "Great Escape" after that of the 1976–77 season. Having been 11 points adrift in March, they avoided relegation on the final day of the season.

== Season review ==
=== League ===
The season began in much the same fashion as the previous season had finished, with County securing only a single win from their first nine matches. With the club finding itself bottom of the league, manager Warren Feeney was sacked on 28 September.

Goalkeeper player/coach James Bittner and fellow first-team coach Sean McCarthy were named joint caretaker managers. Their only matches in charge were the 2–1 home defeat against Swansea City Under-23s in the League Trophy fixture on 4 October and the League Two 0–0 draw versus Colchester United on 8 October.

Graham Westley was appointed team manager effective from 10 October with Dino Maamria his assistant manager. Despite losing the first two league games, form improved and Newport went seven games unbeaten in all competitions, including three successive league wins in October and November. County were now just outside the relegation places, but this was to last just the one game. In a disastrous spell, the next eight games were lost, with Newport falling ever further from safety. Following draws with Colchester United and Barnet, a vital win was secured against Hartlepool United, but that was the last of Westley's tenure. Of the next seven games, four were drawn and three lost, including a 4–0 humiliation to fellow strugglers Leyton Orient. Westley was sacked on 9 March with County now 11 points adrift of safety with 12 games left to play. Newport-born Mike Flynn, who had been brought back as a player by Westley, took over as manager, with Lennie Lawrence as assistant.

Flynn's impact was instant, with back-to-back wins against Crewe Alexandra and Morecambe in March, and consecutive 1–0 wins against Crawley Town, Exeter City and Yeovil Town in April, he had accrued more league wins in his eight games in charge than Westley had in 24. With four games left, County were no longer bottom, but still in a relegation place. The next game at promotion-chasing Plymouth Argyle was lost 6–1, confirming the host's place in League One, but with relegation rivals Hartlepool United losing 2–1 at bottom-of-the-table Leyton Orient, County were only one point behind them.

At home to Accrington Stanley, County recorded another vital 1–0 win to climb out of the bottom two for the first time in five months, two points clear of Hartlepool. With two games now remaining, their fate was now in their own hands.

In the penultimate game of the season, a County win combined with a Hartlepool loss would see Newport safe. County took the lead at Carlisle United in the 12th minute, and Hartlepool were losing at Cheltenham Town in the 17th. However, two goals from Carlisle in the second half meant that both Newport and Hartlepool lost, leaving County still two points clear with a single game remaining.

For the final decisive game of the season, Newport were home to mid-table Notts County and Hartlepool were at home to promoted Doncaster Rovers. With County two points clear, anything other than a win for Hartlepool would see Newport safe and them relegated. If United won and County could only draw then County would be relegated on goal difference — a hangover of their 6–1 drubbing in Plymouth. For the first 30 minutes both games were deadlocked at 0–0 — enough to keep county up. On 31 minutes, Andy Williams scored for Doncaster and on 34 minutes Mickey Demetriou scored a penalty for County, who were now five points clear as things stood. In the second half, Jorge Grant scored an equaliser for Notts County in the 62nd minute — Newport were now only three points clear, but still safe. Coming up to the last 15 minutes of each game it looked likely that that was how both games would end, but Devante Rodney scored an equaliser for Pools in the 74th minute. Newport now knew that another Hartlepool goal would win it for them and condemn County to relegation. Eight minutes later Rodney scored his second, putting Hartlepool in front and keeping Pools up on goal difference. With the clock ticking down to full-time, County defender Mark O'Brien pushed forward in the 89th minute and scored the winner for Newport to complete the Great Escape and relegate Pools.

Mike Flynn had inspired a written-off squad to seven wins in twelve matches, which included games against six of those who finished in the League Two top seven, achieved on the worst pitch in the Football League.

=== Cup ===
In the League Cup round 1, County were drawn at home to Milton Keynes Dons. Despite leading 2–0, goals in the 63rd, 70th and 90th minutes for the visitors secured them the win and progression into the second round.

In the EFL Trophy, County finished bottom of Group B following defeats to Plymouth Argyle and the Swansea City Under-23s, and a sole win against AFC Wimbledon.

In the FA Cup, County were drawn away at National League North qualifiers Alfreton Town. Despite taking the lead in the 65th minute, Town equalised in the 74th minute to force a replay at Rodney Parade. That game was won 4–1 after extra time, as County had again taken the lead in the 68th minute, only for Town to equalise in the 74th. The second-round match away at Plymouth Argyle was drawn 0–0, forcing another replay at Rodney Parade. In the intervening period, the draw for the third round had taken place, with the winners rewarded with a trip to Premier League Liverpool. The game went into extra time as it too finished 0–0. Argyle were awarded a penalty shortly into the first period of extra time, but Paul Garita hit the post. They were awarded a second with 10 minutes of extra time remaining and Graham Carey made no mistake to score the winner and send Plymouth to Anfield.

=== Results summary ===
Overall								Home						Away					
Pld	W	D	L	GF	GA	GD	Pts	W	D	L	GF	GA	GD	W	D	L	GF	GA	GD
46	12	12	22	51	73	−22	48	6	8	9	26	35	−9	6	4	13	25	38	−13

Last updated: 6 May 2017.

=== Results by round ===
Round	1	2	3	4	5	6	7	8	9	10	11	12	13	14	15	16	17	18	19	20	21	22	23	24	25	26	27	28	29	30	31	32	33	34	35	36	37	38	39	40	41	42	43	44	45	46
Ground	H	A	A	H	A	H	A	H	A	A	A	H	H	A	H	A	H	A	H	A	H	H	A	A	H	A	H	A	H	H	A	H	A	H	A	A	H	H	A	H	A	H	A	H	A	H
Result	L	W	L	D	D	D	L	L	L	D	L	L	D	W	W	W	L	L	L	L	L	L	L	L	D	D	W	D	D	D	L	D	L	L	W	W	L	D	L	W	W	W	L	W	L	W
Position	18	12	18	17	18	20	20	23	24	24	24	24	24	24	24	22	24	24	24	24	24	24	24	24	24	24	24	24	24	24	24	24	24	24	24	23	23	23	23	23	23	23	23	22	22	22

Updated to match(es) played on 6 May 2017. Source:
A = Away; H = Home; W = Win; D = Draw; L = Loss

== Transfers ==
=== Transfers in ===
Date from	Position	Nationality	Name	From	Fee	Ref.
1 July 2016	LB	(England)	Dan Butler	Torquay United	Free transfer	
1 July 2016	RB	(England)	Jazzi Barnum-Bobb	Cardiff City	Free transfer	
1 July 2016	CB	(England)	Scot Bennett	Notts County	Free transfer	
1 July 2016	GK	(England)	James Bittner	Plymouth Argyle	Free transfer	
1 July 2016	LW	(Wales)	Jack Compton	Yeovil Town	Free transfer	
1 July 2016	CM	(England)	Joss Labadie	Dagenham & Redbridge	Free transfer	
1 July 2016	LM	(England)	Jennison Myrie-Williams	Sligo Rovers	Free transfer	
1 July 2016	CM	(England)	Mark Randall	Barnet	Free transfer	
1 July 2016	LW	(England)	Sean Rigg	AFC Wimbledon	Free transfer	
1 July 2016	CB	(England)	Jamie Turley	Eastleigh	Free transfer	
4 July 2016	CM	(England)	Ben Tozer	Yeovil Town	Free transfer	
17 July 2016	CF	(England)	Jon Parkin	Forest Green Rovers	Free transfer	
27 July 2016	CF	(England)	Marlon Jackson	Oxford City	Free transfer	
30 July 2016	RB	(England)	Paul Bignot	Solihull Moors	Free transfer	
25 August 2016	GK	(England)	Marcus Beauchamp	Norwich City	Free transfer	
8 November 2016	LM	(England)	Jack Jebb	Stevenage	Free transfer	
8 November 2016	CF	(Republic of Ireland)	Josh O'Hanlon	AFC Bournemouth	Free transfer	
25 November 2016	CB	(Ivory Coast)	Abdoulaye Méïté	SJK	Free transfer	
1 January 2017	CF	(England)	Aaron Williams	Peterborough United	Free transfer	
6 January 2017	CB	(Republic of Ireland)	Mark O'Brien	Luton Town	Free transfer	
6 January 2017	CF	(England)	Craig Reid	Gloucester City	Free transfer	
7 January 2017	CM	(Wales)	Mike Flynn	Undy Athletic	Free transfer	
10 January 2017	CB	(England)	Mickey Demetriou	Shrewsbury Town	Free transfer	
20 January 2017	CM	(England)	Mitchell Rose	Mansfield Town	Free transfer	
23 January 2017	CF	(England)	Ryan Bird	Eastleigh	Free transfer	
10 February 2017	CM	(France)	Maxime Blanchard	Unattached	Free transfer	

=== Loans in ===
Date from	Position	Nationality	Name	From	Date until	Ref.
8 August 2016	RM	(England)	Jordan Green	AFC Bournemouth	9 January 2017	
8 August 2016	CM	(Wales)	Josh Sheehan	Swansea City	9 March 2017	
31 August 2016	LB	(Scotland)	Kyle Cameron	Newcastle United	9 January 2017	
31 August 2016	RM	(Republic of Ireland)	Reece Grego-Cox	Queens Park Rangers	9 January 2017	
31 August 2016	CF	(England)	Rhys Healey	Cardiff City	9 January 2017	
1 January 2017	CF	(England)	Jaanai Gordon	West Ham United	End of season	
4 January 2017	CB	(England)	Sid Nelson	Millwall	End of season	
5 January 2017	RB	(Wales)	David Pipe	Eastleigh	End of season	
10 January 2017	CF	(Kosovo)	Florent Bojaj	Huddersfield Town	10 April 2017	
13 January 2017	LM	(Wales)	Alex Samuel	Swansea City	End of season	

=== Transfers out ===
Date from	Position	Nationality	Name	To	Fee	Ref.
3 January 2017	MF	(Wales)	Lewis Bamford	Free agent	Released	
3 January 2017	CB	(Wales)	Ben Jones	Free agent	Released	
3 January 2017	MF	(Wales)	Dafydd Jones	Free agent	Released	
3 January 2017	CF	(England)	Jon Parkin	York City	Free	
9 January 2017	LM	(England)	Jack Jebb	Free agent	Released	
9 January 2017	CF	(Republic of Ireland)	Josh O'Hanlon	Free agent	Released	
14 January 2017	CB	(Ivory Coast)	Abdoulaye Méïté	Free agent	Released	
14 February 2017	CM	(France)	Maxime Blanchard	Free agent	Released	
30 June 2017	CB	(Wales)	Liam Angel	Free agent	Released	
30 June 2017	GK	(England)	Marcus Beauchamp	Free agent	Released	
30 June 2017	RB	(England)	Paul Bignot	Free agent	Released	
30 June 2017	LW	(Wales)	Jack Compton	Free agent	Released	
30 June 2017	CB	(Wales)	Darren Jones	Free agent	Released	
30 June 2017	CF	(England)	Tom Meechan	Free agent	Released	
30 June 2017	CB	(England)	Kieran Parselle	Free agent	Released	
30 June 2017	MF	(Wales)	Finlay Wood	Free agent	Released	
30 June 2017	CF	(England)	Craig Reid	Free agent	Released	
30 June 2017	CF	(England)	Ryan Bird	Free agent	Released	
30 June 2017	MF	(England)	Mitchell Rose	Free agent	Released	
30 June 2017	CF	(England)	Lenell John-Lewis	Free agent	Released	
30 June 2017	MF	(England)	Mark Randall	Free agent	Released	
30 June 2017	LW	(England)	Jennison Myrie-Williams	Free agent	Released	

=== Loans out ===
Date from	Position	Nationality	Name	To	Date until	Ref.
2 August 2016	CF	(England)	Tom Meechan	Weston-super-Mare	31 January 2017	
4 August 2016	CB	(England)	Kieran Parselle	Salisbury	31 January 2017	
31 August 2016	LM	(Wales)	Dafydd Jones	Monmouth Town	3 January 2017	
31 August 2016	CB	(Wales)	Ben Jones	Abergavenny Town	3 January 2017	
23 September 2016	CM	(England)	Tom Owen-Evans	Gloucester City	7 November 2016	
30 November 2016	CF	(England)	Jon Parkin	York City	3 January 2017	
15 February 2017	LM	(Wales)	Jack Compton	Merthyr Town	End of season	
22 February 2017	GK	(England)	Marcus Beauchamp	Slimbridge	22 April 2017	
23 February 2017	CF	(England)	Tom Meechan	Hungerford Town	End of season	

== Managerial statistics ==
Only competitive games from the 2016–17 season are included.

Name	Nat.	From	To	Record								Honours
Name	Nat.	From	To	PLD	W	D	L	GF	GA	GD	W%	Honours
Warren Feeney	(Northern Ireland)	15 January 2016	28 September 2016	11	1	3	7	13	22	−9	9.1	
Sean McCarthy & James Bittner	(Wales) & (England)	28 September 2016	9 October 2016	2	0	1	1	1	2	−1	0.0	
Graham Westley	(England)	10 October 2016	9 March 2017	29	6	9	14	34	45	−11	20.7	
Michael Flynn	(Wales)	9 March 2017	–	12	7	1	4	14	16	−2	58.3	

== Competitions ==
=== Pre-season friendlies ===
On 5 July 2016, Newport County announced a pre-season tour of Poland.

8 July 2016 Friendly	Caldicot Town	2–2	Newport County	Caldicot
19:00 BST (UTC+1)	Carey 12' (pen.); James 42'	Report	Jackson 15' (pen.); Compton 90+1'	Stadium: Jubilee Way; Referee: Phil Bates

13 July 2016 Friendly	KS Polkowice	0–2	Newport County	Polkowice, Poland
17:00 CEST (UTC+2)		Report	Jackson; Meechan	Stadium: Stadion KS Polkowice

16 July 2016 Friendly	FC Hradec Králové	2–0	Newport County	Wałbrzych, Poland
11:00 CEST (UTC+2)				Stadium: Wałbrzych

22 July 2016 Friendly	Undy Athletic	1–0	Newport County	Undy
19:00 BST (UTC+1)	Clayton 15'			Stadium: The Causeway

23 July 2016 Friendly	Newport County	0–2	Coventry City	Newport
15:00 BST (UTC+1)			Thomas 43'; Willis 57'	Stadium: Newport Stadium

26 July 2016 Friendly	Weston-super-Mare	1–8	Newport County	Weston-super-Mare
19:00 BST (UTC+1)	Mawford 42'		Rigg; Randall; Randall (pen.); Myrie-Williams; Parkin; Labadie; Jackson; Jackson	Stadium: Woodspring Stadium

28 July 2016 Friendly	Ton Pentre	5–0	Newport County	Ton Pentre
19:00 BST (UTC+1)	Reed; Jacka; Shephard; Morris; Reed			Stadium: Ynys Park

30 July 2016 Friendly	Forest Green Rovers	4–3	Newport County	Nailsworth
15:00 BST (UTC+1)	Murphy 2'; Tubbs 71', 76'; Moore 78'	Report	Jackson 25'; Rigg 57'; Myrie-Williams 85' (pen.)	Stadium: The New Lawn; Attendance: 624 (165 County fans)

1 August 2016 Friendly	Gloucester City	1–0	Newport County	Cinderford
19:45 BST (UTC+1)	Parker 69'			Stadium: Causeway Stadium

=== League Two table ===
Pos	Team	Pld	W	D	L	GF	GA	GD	Pts	Promotion, qualification or relegation
20	Yeovil Town	46	11	17	18	49	64	−15	50	
21	Cheltenham Town	46	12	14	20	49	69	−20	50	
22	Newport County	46	12	12	22	51	73	−22	48	
23	Hartlepool United (R)	46	11	13	22	54	75	−21	46	Relegation to the National League
24	Leyton Orient (R)	46	10	6	30	47	87	−40	36	Relegation to the National League

Updated to match(es) played on 6 May 2017. Source: BBC Sport
Rules for classification: 1) Points; 2) Goal difference; 3) Number of goals scored
(R) Relegated

=== League Two ===
6 August 2016 1	Newport County	2–3	Mansfield Town	Newport
15:00 BST (UTC+1)	Compton 18'; Labadie 78'	Report	Green 12'; Rose 66'; Hurst 90+3'	Stadium: Rodney Parade; Attendance: 2,790 (339 away); Referee: Robert Jones

13 August 2016 2	Leyton Orient	0–1	Newport County	Leyton
15:00 BST (UTC+1)		Report	Turley 34'	Stadium: Brisbane Road; Attendance: 4,184; Referee: Michael Salisbury

16 August 2016 3	Luton Town	2–1	Newport County	Luton
19:45 BST (UTC+1)	McGeehan 62' (pen.); McGeehan 90+6' (pen.)	Report	Myrie-Williams 70'	Stadium: Kenilworth Road; Attendance: 7,058; Referee: Charles Breakspear

20 August 2016 4	Newport County	1–1	Crewe Alexandra	Newport
15:00 BST (UTC+1)	Rigg 81'	Report	Kiwomya 16'	Stadium: Rodney Parade; Attendance: 2,268; Referee: John Brooks

27 August 2016 5	Hartlepool United	2–2	Newport County	Hartlepool
15:00 BST (UTC+1)	Featherstone 2'; Amond 38'	Report	Rigg 4'; Parkin 27'	Stadium: Victoria Park; Attendance: 3,261; Referee: Andy Haines

10 September 2016 6	Newport County	2–2	Cheltenham Town	Newport
15:00 BST (UTC+1)	Parkin 18', 37'	Report	Hall 11'; Wright 34'	Stadium: Rodney Parade; Attendance: 2,656; Referee: Carl Boyeson

17 September 2016 7	Doncaster Rovers	2–0	Newport County	Doncaster
15:00 BST (UTC+1)	Coppinger 17'; Williams 59'	Report		Stadium: Keepmoat Stadium; Attendance: 5,254; Referee: David Webb

24 September 2016 8	Newport County	1–2	Cambridge United	Newport
15:00 BST (UTC+1)	Healey 10'	Report	Ikpeazu 61'; Berry 83'	Stadium: Rodney Parade; Attendance: 2,225; Referee: Nick Kinseley

27 September 2016 9	Grimsby Town	1–0	Newport County	Cleethorpes
19:45 BST (UTC+1)	Bogle 88' (pen.)	Report		Stadium: Blundell Park; Attendance: 4,296; Referee: Ben Toner

8 October 2016 10	Colchester United	0–0	Newport County	Colchester
15:00 BST (UTC+1)		Report		Stadium: Colchester Community Stadium; Attendance: 3,088; Referee: Mark Haywood

15 October 2016 11	Yeovil Town	1–0	Newport County	Yeovil
15:00 BST (UTC+1)	Butler 81' (o.g.)	Report		Stadium: Huish Park; Attendance: 3,353; Referee: Dean Whitestone

22 October 2016 12	Newport County	1–3	Plymouth Argyle	Newport
15:00 BST (UTC+1)	Parkin 50'	Report	Carey 38' (pen.); Carey 55' (pen.); Slew 78'	Stadium: Rodney Parade; Attendance: 3,460; Referee: Michael Salisbury

25 October 2016 13	Newport County	2–2	Barnet	Newport
19:45 BST (UTC+1)	Tozer 32'; Rigg 89' (pen.)	Report; Report	Akinde 76', 85'	Stadium: Rodney Parade; Attendance: 2,381; Referee: Graham Salisbury

29 October 2016 14	Accrington Stanley	1–3	Newport County	Accrington
15:00 BST (UTC+1)	Donacien 79'	Report	Healey 47'; Barnum-Bobb 62'; Sheehan 90+4'	Stadium: Crown Ground; Attendance: 1,251; Referee: Robert Jones

12 November 2016 15	Newport County	2–0	Carlisle United	Newport
15:00 UTC	Sheehan 2'; Healey 72'	Report		Stadium: Rodney Parade; Attendance: 2,521; Referee: Darren England

19 November 2016 16	Notts County	0–3	Newport County	Nottingham
15:00 UTC		Report	Rigg 34'; Healey 38'; Sheehan 62'	Stadium: Meadow Lane; Attendance: 3,883; Referee: Andy Haines

22 November 2016 17	Newport County	0–1	Wycombe Wanderers	Newport
19:45 UTC		Report	Jombati 88'	Stadium: Rodney Parade; Attendance: 2,010; Referee: John Busby

26 November 2016 18	Blackpool	4–1	Newport County	Blackpool
15:00 UTC	Potts 4'; Payne 61'; Vassell 72'; Mellor 83'	Report	Healey 21'	Stadium: Bloomfield Road; Attendance: 3,062; Referee: Mark Heywood

6 December 2016 19	Newport County	0–2	Stevenage	Newport
19:45 UTC		Report; Report	Jones 9' (o.g.); Pett 39'	Stadium: Rodney Parade; Attendance: 1,877; Referee: Kevin Johnson

17 December 2016 20	Crawley Town	3–1	Newport County	Crawley
15:00 UTC	Collins 3'; Yorwerth 48'; Smith 52'	Report	Labadie 33'	Stadium: Broadfield Stadium; Attendance: 2,022; Referee: Nick Kinseley

26 December 2016 21	Newport County	2–3	Portsmouth	Newport
15:00 UTC	Sheehan 25'; Healey 51'	Report	Rose 56'; Stevens 80'; Naismith 87'	Stadium: Rodney Parade; Attendance: 3,714; Referee: Charles Breakspear

31 December 2016 22	Newport County	1–4	Exeter City	Newport
15:00 UTC	Rigg 81'	Report	Watkins 45+1', 47', 90+5'; Wheeler 53'	Stadium: Rodney Parade; Attendance: 2,663; Referee: Darren Deadman

2 January 2017 23	Wycombe Wanderers	2–1	Newport County	High Wycombe
15:00 UTC	Wood 70'; Cowan-Hall 80'	Report	Randall 60'	Stadium: Adams Park; Attendance: 4,288; Referee: Lee Collins

7 January 2017 24	Stevenage	3–1	Newport County	Stevenage
15:00 UTC	Godden 9', 42', 62' (pen.)	Report	Butler 89'	Stadium: Broadhall Way; Attendance: Robert Lewis; Referee: 2.185

14 January 2017 25	Newport County	1–1	Colchester United	Newport
15:00 UTC	Sheehan 23'	Report	Porter 35' (pen.)	Stadium: Rodney Parade; Attendance: 2,397; Referee: Michael Salisbury

21 January 2017 26	Barnet	0–0	Newport County	Edgware
15:00 UTC		Report		Stadium: The Hive Stadium; Attendance: 2,623; Referee: Darren England

28 January 2017 27	Newport County	3–1	Hartlepool United	Newport
15:00 UTC	Bird 15'; Williams 56'; Butler 71'	Report	Amond 90+4'	Stadium: Rodney Parade; Attendance: 2,271; Referee: Kevin Johnson

4 February 2017 28	Cheltenham Town	1–1	Newport County	Cheltenham
15:00 UTC	Gordon 90+3'	Report	Wootton 62'	Stadium: Whaddon Road; Attendance: 3,763; Referee: Chris Sarginson

10 February 2017 29	Newport County	0–0	Doncaster Rovers	Newport
19:45 UTC		Report		Stadium: Rodney Parade; Attendance: 2,653; Referee: David Webb

14 February 2017 30	Newport County	0–0	Grimsby Town	Newport
19:45 UTC		Report		Stadium: Rodney Parade; Attendance: 1,868; Referee: John Busby

18 February 2017 31	Cambridge United	3–2	Newport County	Cambridge
15:00 UTC	Corr 63'; Legge 72'; Roberts 90+3'	Report	Bird 43', 57'	Stadium: Abbey Stadium; Attendance: 4,175; Referee: Trevor Kettle

21 February 2017 32	Newport County	1–1	Morecambe	Newport
19:45 UTC	Williams 18'	Report	Rose 64'	Stadium: Rodney Parade; Attendance: 1,988; Referee: Graham Salisbury

25 February 2017 33	Mansfield Town	2–1	Newport County	Mansfield
15:00 UTC	Pearce 17'; Coulthirst 75' (pen.)	Report	Bird 5'	Stadium: Field Mill; Attendance: 3,824; Referee: Ross Joyce

4 March 2017 34	Newport County	0–4	Leyton Orient	Newport
15:00 UTC		Report	Alzate 8'; Koroma 13', 45+2', 64' (pen.)	Stadium: Rodney Parade; Attendance: 3,378; Referee: Gavin Ward

11 March 2017 35	Crewe Alexandra	1–2	Newport County	Crewe
15:00 UTC	Cooke 22'	Report	Butler 53'; Labadie 89'	Stadium: Gresty Road; Attendance: 3,725; Referee: Mark Haywood

14 March 2017 36	Morecambe	0–1	Newport County	Morecambe
19:45 UTC		Report	Bird 67' (pen.)	Stadium: Globe Arena; Attendance: 1,080; Referee: Peter Bankes

18 March 2017 37	Newport County	1–3	Blackpool	Newport
15:00 UTC	Samuel 74'	Report	Osayi-Samuel 16', 90+5'; Cullen 68' (pen.)	Stadium: Rodney Parade; Attendance: 2,427; Referee: Brett Huxtable

21 March 2017 38	Newport County	1–1	Luton Town	Newport
19:45 UTC	Rigg 28'	Report	Hylton 5' (pen.)	Stadium: Rodney Parade; Attendance: 2,304; Referee: Charles Breakspear

25 March 2017 39	Portsmouth	2–1	Newport County	Portsmouth
15:00 UTC	Bennett 42'; Naismith 59'	Report	Samuel 77'	Stadium: Fratton Park; Attendance: 17,364; Referee: Tim Robinson

1 April 2017 40	Newport County	1–0	Crawley Town	Newport
15:00 BST (UTC+1)	Demetriou 18'	Report		Stadium: Rodney Parade; Attendance: 2,946; Referee: Darren England

8 April 2017 41	Exeter City	0–1	Newport County	Exeter
15:00 BST (UTC+1)		Report	Owen-Evans 53'	Stadium: St James Park; Attendance: Eddie Ilderton; Referee: 4,040

14 April 2017 42	Newport County	1–0	Yeovil Town	Newport
15:00 BST (UTC+1)	Demetriou 57'	Report		Stadium: Rodney Parade; Attendance: 3,789; Referee: Dean Whitestone

17 April 2017 43	Plymouth Argyle	6–1	Newport County	Plymouth
15:00 BST (UTC+1)	Kennedy 39', 65'; Jervis 42', 73'; Carey 52'; Taylor 58'	Report	Williams 90+1'	Stadium: Home Park; Attendance: 13,971; Referee: Graham Horwood

22 April 2017 44	Newport County	1–0	Accrington Stanley	Newport
15:00 BST (UTC+1)	Bird 60'	Report		Stadium: Rodney Parade; Attendance: 3,719; Referee: Mark Heywood

29 April 2017 45	Carlisle United	2–1	Newport County	Carlisle
15:00 BST (UTC+1)	Ibehre 58'; Adams 60'	Report	Demetriou 12'	Stadium: Brunton Park; Attendance: 5,402; Referee: David Webb

6 May 2017 46	Newport County	2–1	Notts County	Newport
17:30 BST (UTC+1)	Demetriou 32' (pen.); O'Brien 89'	Report	Grant 62'	Stadium: Rodney Parade; Attendance: 7,326; Referee: Nigel Miller

=== EFL Cup ===
9 August 2016 Round 1	Newport County	2–3	Milton Keynes Dons	Newport
19:30 BST (UTC+1)	Jackson 31'; Randall 55' (pen.)	Report	Bowditch 63' (pen.); Tilney 70'; Bowditch 90'	Stadium: Rodney Parade; Attendance: 1,402; Referee: Oliver Langford

=== EFL Trophy ===
Pos	Div	Team	Pld	W	PW	PL	L	GF	GA	GD	Pts	Qualification
1	L1	AFC Wimbledon	3	2	0	0	1	5	3	+2	6	Advance to Round 2
2	ACA	Swansea City U21	3	2	0	0	1	4	4	0	6	Advance to Round 2
3	L2	Plymouth Argyle	3	1	0	0	2	5	5	0	3	
4	L2	Newport County	3	1	0	0	2	4	6	−2	3	

Source: Sky Sports

30 August 2016 Southern Group B	Plymouth Argyle	4–1	Newport County	Plymouth
19:45 BST (UTC+1)	Slew 51'; Jervis 58'; Bulvitis 69'; Tanner 90+3'	Report	Green 19'	Stadium: Home Park; Attendance: 2,349; Referee: Andy Davies

4 October 2016 Southern Group B	Newport County	1–2	Swansea City Under 23	Newport
19:45 BST (UTC+1)	Myrie-Williams 90+3'	Report	Biabi 35'; Samuel 88'	Stadium: Rodney Parade; Attendance: 807; Referee: Brett Huxtable

8 November 2016 Southern Group B	Newport County	2–0	AFC Wimbledon	Newport
19:30 UTC	Bennett 7'; Barnum-Bobb 85'	Report; Report		Stadium: Rodney Parade; Attendance: 368; Referee: Andy Davies

=== FA Cup ===
6 November 2016 Round 1	Alfreton Town	1–1	Newport County	Alfreton
14:00 UTC	Kennedy 74'	Report	Sheehan 65'	Stadium: North Street; Attendance: 1,109; Referee: Graham Horwood

15 November 2016 Round 1 replay	Newport County	4–1 (a.e.t.)	Alfreton Town	Newport
19:45 UTC	Healey 68'; Green 97'; Sheehan 110'; Barnum-Bobb 117'	Report; Report	Priestley 74'	Stadium: Rodney Parade; Attendance: 1,189; Referee: Brett Huxtable

3 December 2016 Round 2	Plymouth Argyle	0–0	Newport County	Plymouth
15:00 UTC		Report		Stadium: Home Park; Attendance: 5,071; Referee: John Brooks

21 December 2016 Round 2 replay	Newport County	0–1 (a.e.t.)	Plymouth Argyle	Newport
19:45 UTC			Carey 113' (pen.)	Stadium: Rodney Parade; Attendance: 5,121; Referee: Dean Whitestone
