= Jordan Green =

English footballer (born 1995)

Personal information
- Full name: Jordan Julious Green
- Date of birth: 22 February 1995 (age 31)
- Place of birth: New Cross, England
- Height: 5 ft 6 in (1.68 m)
- Positions: Winger; forward

Youth career
- –2011: Fulham

Senior career*
Years	Team	Apps	(Gls)
2014–2015	Banbury United	26	(4)
2015–2017	AFC Bournemouth	0	(0)
2016–2017	→ Newport County (loan)	10	(0)
2017	→ Leyton Orient (loan)	0	(0)
2017–2019	Yeovil Town	56	(6)
2019–2021	Barnsley	12	(1)
2020	→ Newport County (loan)	11	(1)
2020	→ Southend United (loan)	3	(0)
2021–2022	Dulwich Hamlet	34	(8)
2022–2023	Gillingham	19	(0)
2023–2024	Ramsgate	30	(5)
- * Club domestic league appearances and goals as of 10:50, 5 September 2026 (UTC)

Jordan Julious Green (born 22 February 1995) is an English professional footballer who plays as a forward.

He began his youth career at the Fulham academy but was released at the age of 16, spending the next four years playing non-league football. He has had spells with AFC Bournemouth, Yeovil Town and Barnsley along with loans at Newport County, Leyton Orient and Southend United, before signing for Dulwich Hamlet on 14 August 2021.

== Career ==
Green is a product of the Fulham academy, where he spent five years, before being released at the age of 16 as coaches deemed him too small, as he was only five feet tall at the time. Following his release, Green played non-league football for Phoenix playing in the Central Midlands League, before joining Southern Football League Division One side Banbury United in November 2014, scoring four goals in 26 league appearances in the 2014–15 season. During his time at the club, Green worked part-time in a local Waitrose supermarket as a shelf-stacker.

=== AFC Bournemouth ===
Green had considered quitting football at the end of the season but his agent offered him a trial at Premier League side AFC Bournemouth in 2015. Green funded the trial himself and impressed enough during training with under-21 coach Stephen Purches and friendly matches against Arsenal and Salisbury to be handed an initial one-year contract by the Cherries.

In August 2016, Green joined Newport County on loan until 3 January 2017, along with Josh Sheehan, making his senior debut the following day, on 9 August 2016, for Newport in a 3–2 defeat to Milton Keynes Dons in the Football League Cup as a 74th-minute substitute in place of Sean Rigg. Green made his Football League debut on 13 August 2016 in the club's following match, being named in the starting line-up in a 1–0 victory over Leyton Orient, playing over an hour before being replaced by Jazzi Barnum-Bobb. Green scored his first goal for Newport on 30 August 2016 during a 4–1 defeat to Plymouth Argyle in the EFL Trophy. Green made a total of sixteen appearances for the Exiles.

On 31 January 2017, Green joined League Two side Leyton Orient on loan until the end of the 2016–17 season. However, Green was unable to be registered by the club due to "a failure to request his return papers from the Welsh FA following the conclusion of the original loan".

=== Yeovil Town ===
On 16 August 2017, Green signed for League Two club Yeovil Town on a free transfer signing a one-year contract.

=== Barnsley ===
On 18 January 2019, Green signed for League One club Barnsley for an undisclosed fee signing a 2 1/2-year deal, with the option of a further year in favour of the club.

On 14 January 2020, Green re-joined his former loan club Newport County on loan until the end of the 2019–20 season. He made his second debut for Newport County on 18 January 2020 in the 2-0 League Two win against Swindon Town as a second-half substitute. Green scored his first goal for Newport on 25 February 2020 in the 4–2 defeat to Grimsby Town in League Two.

Green made another loan move to League Two on 20 August 2020, joining Southend United on a six-month deal. The loan was terminated early in October after Green sustained an ankle injury.

On 4 January 2021, Green's contract with Barnsley was terminated by mutual consent.

=== Dulwich Hamlet ===
On 14 August 2021, Green signed for National League South club Dulwich Hamlet following a successful trial.

=== Gillingham ===
On 15 July, Green signed for League Two side Gillingham following a successful trial period during pre season. Green scored his first goal for the club during an EFL Cup first round tie away at AFC Wimbledon, scoring the second in a 2–0 win to send the Kent side to the second round. Green went on to make 26 appearances for the side in all competitions, but on 26 January 2023 Gillingham manager Neil Harris told the media that Green was "free to leave and find regular football but he is not going to play for us again at the club". Although he remained with the club, he was released at the end of the season.

=== Ramsgate ===
Green joined Ramsgate of the Isthmian League when his Gillingham contract ended.

== Career statistics ==
As of end of 2023–24 season

Appearances and goals by club, season and competition
Club	Season	League			FA Cup		League Cup		Other		Total	
Club	Season	Division	Apps	Goals	Apps	Goals	Apps	Goals	Apps	Goals	Apps	Goals
Banbury United	2014–15	Southern League Premier Division	26	4	0	0	—		6 (Note: Four appearances in FA Trophy, one appearance and one goal in Oxfordshire Senior Cup, one appearance and one goal in Buckingham Charity Cup)	2	32	6
AFC Bournemouth	2015–16	Premier League	0	0	0	0	0	0	—		0	0
AFC Bournemouth	2016–17	Premier League	0	0	0	0	0	0	—		0	0
AFC Bournemouth	Total		0	0	0	0	0	0	—		0	0
Newport County (loan)	2016–17	League Two	10	0	3	1	1	0	2 (Note: Appearances in EFL Trophy)	1	16	2
Leyton Orient (loan)	2016–17	League Two	0	0	0	0	0	0	0	0	0	0
Yeovil Town	2017–18	League Two	37	2	4	2	0	0	6	0	47	4
Yeovil Town	2018–19	League Two	19	4	0	0	0	0	2	0	21	4
Yeovil Town	Total		56	6	4	2	0	0	8	0	68	8
Barnsley	2018–19	League One	10	1	—		—		—		10	1
Barnsley	2019–20	Championship	2	0	0	0	0	0	—		2	0
Barnsley	2020–21	Championship	0	0	0	0	0	0	—		0	0
Barnsley	Total		12	1	0	0	0	0	—		12	1
Newport County (loan)	2019–20	League Two	11	1	0	0	0	0	2	0	13	1
Southend United (loan)	2020–21	League Two	3	0	0	0	1	0	0	0	4	0
Dulwich Hamlet	2021–22	National League South	34	8	0	0	—		2 (Note: Two appearances in FA Trophy)	0	36	8
Gillingham	2022–23	League Two	19	0	3	0	3	1	1	0	26	1
Ramsgate	2023–24	Isthmian League South East Division	30	5	7	0	—		1 (Note: Appearance(s) in Isthmian League South East Division play-offs)	0	38	5
Career totals			201	25	17	3	5	1	22	3	245	32

== Honours ==
Barnsley

- EFL League One runner-up: 2018–19
