= 2015–16 Cardiff City F.C. season =

Welsh football club season

Cardiff City
2015–16 season
- Owner: Vincent Tan
- Chairman: Mehmet Dalman
- Manager: Russell Slade
- Stadium: Cardiff City Stadium
- Football League Championship: 8th
- FA Cup: Third Round
- League Cup: Second Round
- Top goalscorer: League: Anthony Pilkington (9); All: Anthony Pilkington (9)
- Highest home attendance: 28,680 (vs. Derby County, 2 Apr)
- Lowest home attendance: 4,782 (vs. Shrewsbury Town, 10 Jan)
- Average home league attendance: 16,463
Home colours	Away colours	Third colours

The 2015–16 season was Cardiff City's 99th season in their existence and the 88th in the Football League, their second consecutive season in the Championship. Along with competing in the Championship, the club will also participate in the FA Cup and League Cup. The season covers the period from 1 July 2015 to 30 June 2016.

== Competitions ==
=== Championship ===
==== League table ====
Pos	Team	Pld	W	D	L	GF	GA	GD	Pts	Promotion, qualification or relegation
6	Sheffield Wednesday	46	19	17	10	66	45	+21	74	Qualification for the Championship play-offs (Note: Four teams play for one spot and promotion to the Premier League.)
7	Ipswich Town	46	18	15	13	53	51	+2	69	
8	Cardiff City	46	17	17	12	56	51	+5	68	
9	Brentford	46	19	8	19	72	67	+5	65	
10	Birmingham City	46	16	15	15	53	49	+4	63	

Source: BBC Sport
Rules for classification: 1) Points; 2) Goal difference; 3) Number of goals scored

==== Results by matchday ====
Matchday	1	2	3	4	5	6	7	8	9	10	11	12	13	14	15	16	17	18	19	20	21	22	23	24	25	26	27	28	29	30	31	32	33	34	35	36	37	38	39	40	41	42	43	44	45	46
Ground	H	A	A	H	A	H	H	A	H	A	A	H	H	A	A	H	A	H	A	H	H	A	A	H	H	A	A	H	A	H	A	H	A	H	A	H	H	A	H	A	A	H	A	H	A	H
Result	D	D	D	W	W	W	L	L	W	D	D	W	D	D	L	W	L	D	W	D	W	L	L	D	W	L	W	D	W	D	D	W	L	W	W	L	W	D	W	D	L	D	L	W	L	D
Position	11	14	13	7	5	2	6	8	5	8	8	8	8	9	9	7	9	10	6	7	7	8	8	10	9	9	9	9	9	9	9	7	8	7	7	7	7	7	7	7	7	7	7	7	7	8

Updated to match(es) played on 7 May 2016. Source: Matches
A = Away; H = Home; W = Win; D = Draw; L = Loss

== Kit ==
Supplier: adidas
Sponsor(s): Visit Malaysia

Home	Away	3rd Kit

Last updated: 14 September 2015.
Source: Historical Football Kits

== Squad ==
No.	Name	Pos.	Nat.	Place of Birth	Age	Apps	Goals	Signed from	Date signed	Fee	Ends
Goalkeepers
1	David Marshall	GK	(Scotland)	Glasgow	31	274	0	Norwich City	12 May 2009	£500,000	2018
21	Simon Moore	GK	(England)	Sandown	26	23	0	Brentford	29 July 2013	£150,000	2017
30	Ben Wilson	GK	(England)	Stanley	23	2	0	Accrington Stanley	November 2014	Free	2017
Defenders
2	Lee Peltier	RB	(England)	Liverpool	30	58	0	Huddersfield Town	24 January 2015	Nominal	2018
3	Fábio	LB	(Brazil)	Rio de Janeiro	25	68	1	Manchester United	29 January 2014	Free	2017
4	Sean Morrison	CB	(England)	Plymouth	25	74	9	Reading	15 August 2014	£2,620,000	2018
5	Bruno Ecuele Manga	CB	(Gabon)	Libreville	27	56	5	Lorient	1 September 2014	£4,400,000	2017
6	Ben Turner	CB	(England)	Birmingham	27	121	4	Coventry City	31 August 2011	£750,000	2016
12	Declan John	LB	(Wales)	Merthyr Tydfil	20	31	0	Academy	1 June 2013	Trainee	2018
16	Matthew Connolly	CB	(England)	Barnet	28	110	6	Queens Park Rangers	22 August 2012	£500,000	2019
28	Scott Malone	LB	(England)	Rowley Regis	25	56	2	Millwall	7 January 2015	£90,000	2017
29	Semi Ajayi	CB	(Nigeria) (England)	London	22	0	0	Arsenal	1 July 2015	Free	2017
Midfielders
7	Peter Whittingham	CM	(England)	Nuneaton	31	423	93	Aston Villa	11 January 2007	£350,000	2017
8	Joe Ralls	CM	(England)	Aldershot	23	94	6	Academy	30 September 2011	Trainee	2020
11	Craig Noone	LW	(England)	Liverpool	28	134	17	Brighton & Hove Albion	30 August 2012	£1,000,000	2018
13	Anthony Pilkington	LW	(Republic of Ireland) (England)	Blackburn	28	62	10	Norwich City	15 August 2014	£875,000	2017
15	Kagisho Dikgacoi	DM	(South Africa)	Brandfort	31	28	0	Crystal Palace	1 July 2014	Free	2017
17	Aron Gunnarsson	CM	(Iceland)	Akureyri	28	197	20	Coventry City	8 July 2011	£350,000	2018
22	Stuart O'Keefe	CM	(England)	Eye	25	33	2	Crystal Palace	28 January 2015	£750,000	2018
23	Matthew Kennedy	RW	(Scotland)	Irvine	21	16	0	Everton	2 February 2015	Undisclosed	2018
24	Kadeem Harris	LW	(England)	Westminster	23	23	2	Wycombe Wanderers	30 January 2012	£150,000	2017
27	Lex Immers	AM	(Netherlands)	The Hague	30	15	5	Feyenoord	21 January 2016	Loan	2016
38	Sammy Ameobi	WG/CF	(Nigeria) (England)	Newcastle upon Tyne	24	38	1	Newcastle United	7 July 2015	Loan	2016
Forwards
26	Kenneth Zohore	CF	(Denmark)	Copenhagen	22	12	2	K.V. Kortrijk	1 February 2016	Loan	2016
37	Tom Lawrence	LW/SS	(Wales)	Wrexham	22	14	0	Leicester City	1 February 2016	Loan	2016
39	Idriss Saadi	CF	(France)	Valence	24	2	0	Clermont	1 September 2015	Undisclosed	2018
Out on loan
9	Kenwyne Jones	CF	(Trinidad and Tobago)	Point Fortin	31	67	19	Stoke City	28 January 2014	Part Exchange	2016
14	Federico Macheda	CF	(Italy)	Rome	24	31	8	Manchester United	1 July 2014	Free	2017
18	Eoin Doyle	CF	(Republic of Ireland)	Dublin	28	18	5	Chesterfield	2 February 2015	£750,000	2018
36	Adedeji Oshilaja	CB	(England)	London	23	3	0	Academy	1 July 2012	Trainee	Undisclosed
—	Tom Adeyemi	CM	(England)	Norwich	24	23	1	Birmingham City	7 August 2014	£882,000	2017
—	Adam Le Fondre	CF	(England)	Stockport	29	25	3	Reading	28 May 2014	£2,170,000	2017
—	Filip Kiss	CM	(Slovakia)	Dunajská Streda	25	36	1	Slovan Bratislava	1 July 2012	£500,000	2016
—	Joe Lewis	GK	(England)	Bury St. Edmunds	28	4	0	Peterborough United	25 May 2012	Free	2016
—	Etien Velikonja	CF	(Slovenia)	Šempeter pri Gorici	27	5	0	Maribor	25 July 2012	£1,574,373	2016

Appearances and goals for the club are up to date as of 7 May 2016.

=== Statistics ===
As of 7 May 2016

No.	Pos	Nat	Player	Total		Championship		FA Cup		League Cup	
No.	Pos	Nat	Player	Apps	Goals	Apps	Goals	Apps	Goals	Apps	Goals
1	GK	(Scotland) SCO	David Marshall	39	0	39+0	0	0+0	0	0+0	0
2	DF	(England) ENG	Lee Peltier	43	0	38+3	0	0+0	0	2+0	0
3	DF	(Brazil) BRA	Fábio	25	1	17+5	1	1+0	0	2+0	0
4	DF	(England) ENG	Sean Morrison	32	3	29+1	3	0+0	0	2+0	0
5	DF	(Gabon) GAB	Bruno Ecuele Manga	27	2	19+5	2	1+0	0	2+0	0
6	DF	(England) ENG	Ben Turner	1	0	1+0	0	0+0	0	0+0	0
7	MF	(England) ENG	Peter Whittingham	37	6	34+2	6	1+0	0	0+0	0
8	MF	(England) ENG	Joe Ralls	44	1	42+1	1	0+0	0	1+0	0
11	MF	(England) ENG	Craig Noone	41	6	24+14	5	0+1	0	2+0	1
12	DF	(Wales) WAL	Declan John	1	0	0+1	0	0+0	0	0+0	0
13	MF	(Republic of Ireland) IRL	Anthony Pilkington	41	9	38+3	9	0+0	0	0+0	0
15	MF	(South Africa) RSA	Kagisho Dikgacoi	25	0	16+7	0	1+0	0	0+1	0
16	MF	(England) ENG	Matthew Connolly	45	1	43+0	1	0+0	0	2+0	0
17	MF	(Iceland) ISL	Aron Gunnarsson	29	2	16+12	2	0+0	0	1+0	0
21	GK	(England) ENG	Simon Moore	8	0	6+1	0	1+0	0	0+0	0
22	MF	(England) ENG	Stuart O'Keefe	26	2	18+5	2	1+0	0	2+0	0
23	MF	(Scotland) SCO	Matthew Kennedy	2	0	0+1	0	0+1	0	0+0	0
24	MF	(England) ENG	Kadeem Harris	8	0	0+7	0	0+0	0	0+1	0
26	FW	(Denmark) DEN	Kenneth Zohore (on loan from K.V. Kortrijk)	12	2	2+10	2	0+0	0	0+0	0
27	MF	(Netherlands) NED	Lex Immers (on loan from Feyenoord)	15	5	14+1	5	0+0	0	0+0	0
28	DF	(England) ENG	Scott Malone	40	2	34+5	2	1+0	0	0+0	0
30	GK	(England) ENG	Ben Wilson	2	0	0+0	0	0+0	0	2+0	0
37	FW	(Wales) WAL	Tom Lawrence (on loan from Leicester City)	14	0	11+3	0	0+0	0	0+0	0
38	MF	(Nigeria) NGR	Sammy Ameobi (on loan from Newcastle United)	38	1	8+28	1	1+0	0	1+0	0
39	FW	(France) FRA	Idriss Saadi	2	0	0+2	0	0+0	0	0+0	0
First team players out on loan:
9	FW	(Trinidad and Tobago) TTO	Kenwyne Jones	20	5	15+4	5	0+0	0	0+1	0
14	FW	(Italy) ITA	Federico Macheda	8	0	0+6	0	1+0	0	1+0	0
18	FW	(Republic of Ireland) IRL	Eoin Doyle	2	0	0+0	0	0+0	0	2+0	0
Loan Players who returned to their parent clubs:
33	FW	(Scotland) SCO	Tony Watt (on loan from Charlton Athletic)	9	2	9+0	2	0+0	0	0+0	0
First team players that left the club:
10	FW	(Republic of Ireland) IRL	Joe Mason	24	6	21+2	6	0+1	0	0+0	0
19	FW	(England) ENG	Alex Revell	13	1	7+3	0	1+0	0	2+0	1
20	DF	(Romania) ROU	Gabriel Tamas	1	0	0+0	0	1+0	0	0+0	0

==== Captains ====
As of 7 May

No.	P	Name	Country	No. games	Notes
1	GK	David Marshall	(Scotland)	40	Club Captain
4	DF	Sean Morrison	(England)	6	Vice-Captain
13	MF	Anthony Pilkington	(Republic of Ireland)	2	
7	MF	Peter Whittingham	(England)	1	

Source: Competitive match reports.
Competitive matches only
Matches started as captain only
Country: FIFA nationality; No.: Squad number; P: Position; Name: Player name; No. Games: Number of games started as captain.

==== Goals record ====
As of 7 May 2016

Rank	No.	Po.	Name	Championship	FA Cup	League Cup	Total
1	13	MF	(Republic of Ireland) Anthony Pilkington	9	0	0	9
2	7	MF	(England) Peter Whittingham	6	0	0	6
2	~~10~~	FW	(Republic of Ireland) Joe Mason	6	0	0	6
2	11	MF	(England) Craig Noone	5	0	1	6
5	~~9~~	FW	(Trinidad and Tobago) Kenwyne Jones	5	0	0	5
5	27	MF	(Netherlands) Lex Immers	5	0	0	5
7	4	DF	(England) Sean Morrison	3	0	0	3
8	5	DF	(Gabon) Bruno Ecuele Manga	2	0	0	2
8	17	MF	(Iceland) Aron Gunnarsson	2	0	0	2
8	22	MF	(England) Stuart O'Keefe	2	0	0	2
8	26	FW	(Denmark) Kenneth Zohore	2	0	0	2
8	28	DF	(England) Scott Malone	2	0	0	2
8	~~33~~	FW	(Scotland) Tony Watt	2	0	0	2
14	3	DF	(Brazil) Fábio	1	0	0	1
14	8	MF	(England) Joe Ralls	1	0	0	1
14	16	DF	(England) Matthew Connolly	1	0	0	1
14	~~19~~	FW	(England) Alex Revell	0	0	1	1
14	38	FW	(England) Sammy Ameobi	1	0	0	1
Total				55*	0	2	56

- Total includes 1 own goal

==== Disciplinary record ====
As of 3 May 2016

Rank	No.	Po.	Name	Championship		FA Cup		League Cup		Total	
Rank	No.	Po.	Name	Yellow card	Red card	Yellow card	Red card	Yellow card	Red card	Yellow card	Red card
1	3	DF	(Brazil) Fábio	8	1	0	0	1	0	9	1
1	2	DF	(England) Lee Peltier	9	1	0	0	0	0	9	1
3	13	MF	(Republic of Ireland) Anthony Pilkington	9	0	0	0	0	0	9	0
3	16	DF	(England) Matthew Connolly	9	0	0	0	0	0	9	0
5	7	MF	(England) Peter Whittingham	8	0	0	0	0	0	8	0
6	4	DF	(England) Sean Morrison	5	0	0	0	1	0	6	0
7	8	MF	(England) Joe Ralls	5	0	0	0	0	0	5	0
7	11	MF	(England) Craig Noone	5	0	0	0	0	0	5	0
7	38	MF	(England) Sammy Ameobi	4	1	0	0	0	0	4	1
10	28	DF	(England) Scott Malone	4	0	0	0	0	0	4	0
11	17	MF	(Iceland) Aron Gunnarsson	3	0	0	0	0	0	3	0
11	22	MF	(England) Stuart O'Keefe	3	0	0	0	0	0	3	0
13	1	GK	(Scotland) David Marshall	0	1	0	0	0	0	0	1
13	6	DF	(England) Ben Turner	1	0	0	0	0	0	1	0
13	~~10~~	FW	(Republic of Ireland) Joe Mason	1	0	0	0	0	0	1	0
13	15	MF	(South Africa) Kagisho Dikgacoi	1	0	0	0	0	0	1	0
13	16	DF	(England) Matthew Connolly	1	0	0	0	0	0	1	0
13	~~19~~	FW	(England) Alex Revell	1	0	0	0	0	0	1	0
13	~~33~~	FW	(Scotland) Tony Watt	1	0	0	0	0	0	1	0
13	37	FW	(Wales) Tom Lawrence	1	0	0	0	0	0	1	0
Total				79	4	0	0	2	0	81	4

=== Suspensions served ===
Date	Matches Missed	Player	Reason	Opponents Missed
2 May 2015	3	David Marshall	(red card) in 2014–15	Fulham (H), QPR (A), Blackburn (A)
3 October 2015	1	Fábio	5× (yellow card)	Preston (A)
19 September 2015	2	David Marshall	(red card) vs Rotherham United	Charlton (H), Brighton (A)
23 January 2016	1	Lee Peltier	(yellow card) (yellow-red card) vs Rotherham United	Huddersfield (A)
13 February 2016	3	Sammy Ameobi	(red card) vs Charlton	Brighton (H), Middlesbrough (A), Preston (H)
8 March 2016	3	Fábio	(red card) vs Leeds	Reading (H), Derby (A), Burnley (H)

=== Contracts ===
Number	Position	Nationality	Name	Contract length	Status	Expiry Date	Ref.
55	RB	(England)	Jazzi Barnum-Bobb	1 year	Extended	June 2016	
—	CM	(Wales)	Tyler Roche	1 year	Extended	June 2016	
—	CM	(Wales)	Macauley Southam	1 year	Signed	June 2016	
60	LB	(Democratic Republic of the Congo)	David Tutonda	1 year	Extended	June 2016	
—	CB	(Wales)	Curtis Watkins	1 year	Extended	June 2016	
30	GK	(England)	Ben Wilson	2 years	Signed	June 2017	
17	CM	(Iceland)	Aron Gunnarsson	3 years	Signed	June 2018	BBC Sport
—	CF	(England)	Rhys Healey	3 years	Signed	June 2018	Cardiff City F.C. Official Site
8	CM	(England)	Joe Ralls	5 years	Signed	June 2020	BBC Sport
16	CB	(England)	Matthew Connolly	3 1/2 years	Signed	June 2019	Cardiff City F.C. Official Site

== Transfers ==
=== In ===
Date	Position	Nationality	Name	From	Fee	Ref.
1 July 2015	CB	(Nigeria) (England)	Semi Ajayi	Arsenal	Free transfer	Cardiff City F.C.
24 July 2015	CB	(France)	Jordan Blaise	Girondins de Bordeaux	Free transfer (Note: Joined the U21 squad.)	Cardiff City F.C.
26 August 2015	CB	(Romania)	Gabriel Tamaș	Unattached	Free transfer	Cardiff City F.C.
31 August 2015	CF	(France)	Idriss Saadi	Clermont Foot	Undisclosed	Cardiff City F.C.
4 September 2015	LB	(Belgium)	Marco Weymans	PSV Eindhoven	Undisclosed	Cardiff City F.C.

=== Loans in ===
Date from	Position	Nationality	Name	From	Until	Ref.
7 July 2015	WG	(Nigeria) (England)	Sammy Ameobi	Newcastle United	End of season	Cardiff City FC
23 November 2015	CF	(Scotland)	Tony Watt	Charlton Athletic	16 January 2016	BBC Sport
21 January 2016	AM	(Netherlands)	Lex Immers	Feyenoord	End of Season	BBC Sport
1 February 2016	CF	(Denmark)	Kenneth Zohore	K.V. Kortrijk	End of Season	BBC Sport
1 February 2016	LW	(Wales)	Tom Lawrence	Leicester City	End of Season	Wales Online

=== Out ===
Date	Position	Nationality	Name	To	Fee	Ref.
9 June 2015	GK	(United States)	Charlie Horton	Leeds United	Free transfer	BBC Sport
15 June 2015	RB	(France)	Kevin Theophile-Catherine	Saint-Étienne	£1.4m	BBC Sport
26 June 2015	CB	(Uruguay)	Maximiliano Amondarain	Free agent	Released	Cardiff City F.C.
1 July 2015	RM	(England)	Anthony Bell	Shildon	Released	
1 July 2015	CM	(Wales)	Jaye Bowen	Merthyr Tydfil	Released	
1 July 2015	CF	(Wales)	Gethyn Hill	Merthyr Tydfil	Released	
1 July 2015	CF	(England)	Danny Johnson	Gateshead	Released	(Note: Johnson joined Gateshead following release.)
1 July 2015	GK	(Wales)	Joe Massaro	Barry Town	Released	
1 July 2015	CF	(England)	Nicky Maynard	Milton Keynes Dons	Released	Cardiff City F.C. (Note: Maynard joined MK Dons following release.BBC Sport)
1 July 2015	RB	(Scotland)	Kevin McNaughton	Wigan Athletic	Released	Cardiff City F.C. (Note: McNaughton joined Wigan Athletic following release.)
1 July 2015	LB	(Wales)	Kane Owen	Aberystwyth Town	Released	
1 July 2015	DM	(Wales)	Ben Watkins	Free agent	Released	
1 July 2015	CB	(Wales)	Bradley Wickham	Free agent	Released	
1 July 2015	CM	(Wales)	Bradley Williams	Free agent	Released	
1 July 2015	CB	(Wales)	Josh Yorwerth	Ipswich Town	Free transfer	BBC Sport
3 August 2015	CB	(England)	Ben Nugent	Crewe Alexandra	Free transfer	Cardiff City F.C.
31 August 2015	CF	(Spain)	Javi Guerra	Rayo Vallecano	Undisclosed	Cardiff City F.C.
28 January 2016	CF	(Republic of Ireland)	Joe Mason	Wolverhampton Wanderers	£3m	BBC Sport
1 February 2016	CF	(England)	Alex Revell	Milton Keynes Dons	Free	BBC Sport
1 February 2016	CB	(Romania)	Gabriel Tamas	Unattached	Free	Cardiff City F.C.

Total income: ▲£4,400,000

=== Loans out ===
Date from	Position	Nationality	Name	To	Date until	Ref.
14 July 2015	CM	(England)	Tom Adeyemi	Leeds United	End of season	Cardiff City FC
24 July 2015	CB	(England)	Adedeji Oshilaja	Gillingham	3 January 2016	Cardiff City FC
3 August 2015	CF	(England)	Adam Le Fondre	Wolverhampton Wanderers	End of season	BBC Sport
7 August 2015	LB	(Democratic Republic of the Congo)	David Tutonda	York City	January 2016	BBC Sport
19 August 2015	CM	(Slovakia)	Filip Kiss	FK Haugesund	End of season	Cardiff City F.C.
22 August 2015	LW	(England)	Kadeem Harris	Barnsley	21 August 2015	Cardiff City F.C.
24 August 2015	GK	(England)	Joe Lewis	Fulham	End of season	Cardiff City F.C.
31 August 2015	CF	(Slovenia)	Etien Velikonja	Lierse	End of season	Cardiff City F.C.
1 September 2015	CF	(Republic of Ireland)	Eoin Doyle	Preston North End	End of season	Cardiff City F.C.
1 September 2015	CF	(England)	Rhys Healey	Dundee	3 January 2016	Cardiff City F.C.
29 September 2015	CB	(Nigeria)	Semi Ajayi	AFC Wimbledon	25 October 2015	Cardiff City F.C.
13 October 2015	RB	(England)	Jazzi Barnum-Bobb	Newport County	2 January 2016	Cardiff City F.C. (Note: Jazzi Barnum-Bobb and Tommy O'Sullivan's loan spells were extended to 2 January.)
13 October 2015	CM	(Wales)	Tommy O'Sullivan	Newport County	2 January 2016	Cardiff City F.C.
20 October 2015	GK	(England)	Ben Wilson	AFC Wimbledon	14 December 2015	BBC Sport (Note: Ben Wilson's loan spell was cut short from 3 January 2016.)
11 November 2015	FW	(England)	Alex Revell	Wigan Athletic	23 January 2016	Cardiff City F.C.
18 November 2015	CB	(England)	Ben Turner	Coventry City	23 December 2015	BBC Sport (Note: Ben Turner's loan spell was cut short from 3 January 2016.)
26 November 2015	CB	(Nigeria)	Semi Ajayi	Crewe Alexandra	5 January 2016	Sky Sports
5 January 2016	CF	(Trinidad and Tobago)	Kenwyne Jones	Al Jazira	End of Season	Cardiff City F.C.
25 January 2016	RW	(Scotland)	Matthew Kennedy	Port Vale	End of Season	BBC Sport
18 February 2016	LB	(Wales)	Declan John	Chesterfield	End of Season	BBC Sport
10 March 2016	CM	(Wales)	Tommy O'Sullivan	Newport County	End of Season	BBC Sport
11 March 2016	CF	(Italy)	Federico Macheda	Nottingham Forest	End of Season	BBC Sport
14 March 2016	CB	(England)	Deji Oshilaja	Gillingham	End of Season	BBC Sport

== Fixtures and results ==
=== Pre-season ===
15 July 2015 Friendly	Forest Green Rovers	1–1	Cardiff City	Nailsworth
19:30 BST	O'Connor 72'	Report	Mason 55'	Stadium: The New Lawn; Attendance: 1,125

18 July 2015 Friendly	Shrewsbury Town	2–2	Cardiff City	Shrewsbury
19:30 BST	Akpa Akpro 8' (pen.); Collins 86'	Report	Mason 26'; Pilkington 55'	Stadium: New Meadow

18 July 2015 Friendly	Carmarthen Town	0–1	Cardiff City XI	Carmarthen
15:00 BST		Report	Rees 11'	Stadium: Richmond Park; Referee: Richard Harrington

21 July 2015 Friendly	Ironi Kiryat Shmona	0–2	Cardiff City	Putten, Netherlands
19:00 BST		Report	Manga 18'; Pilkington 82'	Stadium: Sportpark Puttereng

24 July 2015 Friendly	Sparta Rotterdam	0–1	Cardiff City	Unknown
17:00 BST		Report	69' Pilkington

28 July 2015 Friendly	Cardiff City	2–1	Watford	Cardiff
19:45 BST	Mason 19', 80'	Report	Deeney 30'	Stadium: Cardiff City Stadium

31 July 2015 Friendly	Bournemouth	2–3	Cardiff City	Bournemouth
19:45 BST	Rantie 27'; Pugh 70'	Report	Ralls 39'; Revell 44', 65'	Stadium: Dean Court

=== Football League Championship ===
8 August 2015 1	Cardiff City	1–1	Fulham	Cardiff
12:00 BST	Noone 86'	BBC Report	47' Smith	Stadium: Cardiff City Stadium; Attendance: 15,429; Referee: Darren Bond

15 August 2015 2	Queen's Park Rangers	2–2	Cardiff City	London
17:15 BST	Hill 33'; Austin 56'	BBC report	63' Morrison; 90' Malone	Stadium: Loftus Road; Attendance: 14,927; Referee: Simon Hooper
Note: Televised Live on Sky

18 August 2015 3	Blackburn Rovers	1–1	Cardiff City	Blackburn
19:45 BST	Hanley 88'	BBC Report	5' Mason	Stadium: Ewood Park; Attendance: 12,025; Referee: Scott Duncan (Northumberland)

22 August 2015 4	Cardiff City	2–0	Wolverhampton Wanderers	Cardiff
17:15 BST	Jones 44'; Ameobi 60'	BBC Report		Stadium: Cardiff City Stadium; Attendance: 14,820; Referee: Andy Davies
Note: Televised Live on Sky

29 August 2015 5	Nottingham Forest	1–2	Cardiff City	Nottingham
15:00 BST	Antonio 86'	BBC Sport	23' Jones; 49' Mason	Stadium: The City Ground; Attendance: 18,762; Referee: Oliver Langford

12 September 2015 6	Cardiff City	2–0	Huddersfield	Cardiff
15:00 BST	Pilkington 69'; Mason 77'	BBC Report		Stadium: Cardiff City Stadium; Attendance: 13,715; Referee: Paul Tierney (Lancashire)

15 September 2015 7	Cardiff City	0–2	Hull City	Cardiff
19:45 BST		Report	8' Diamé; 80' Hernández	Stadium: Cardiff City Stadium; Attendance: 13,763; Referee: Chris Sarginson (Staffordshire)

19 September 2015 8	Rotherham United	2–1	Cardiff City	Rotherham
15:00 BST	Odjidja-Ofoe 43' (pen.); Connolly 90+3' (o.g.)	Report	(red card) 42' Marhsall; 45+4' (pen.) Whittingham	Stadium: New York Stadium; Attendance: 8,935; Referee: Keith Hill (Hertfordshire)

26 September 2015 9	Cardiff City	2–1	Charlton Athletic	Cardiff
15:00 BST	Mason 53'; Morrison 76'	BBC Report	49' Ahearne-Grant	Stadium: Cardiff City Stadium; Attendance: 13,980; Referee: Andy Madley

3 October 2015 10	Brighton & Hove Albion	1–1	Cardiff City	Brighton
15:00 BST	Stephens 38'	BBC Report	5' Mason	Stadium: Falmer Stadium; Attendance: 26,399; Referee: Charles Breakspear (Surrey)

17 October 2015 11	Preston North End	0–0	Cardiff City	Preston
15:00 BST		BBC Report		Stadium: Deepdale; Attendance: 11,125; Referee: Stuart Attwell (Warwickshire)

20 October 2015 12	Cardiff City	1–0	Middlesbrough	Cardiff
19:45 BST	Friend 86' (o.g.)	Report		Stadium: Cardiff City Stadium; Attendance: 13,371; Referee: Dean Whitestone (Northampton)

26 October 2015 13	Cardiff City	0–0	Bristol City	Cardiff
19:45 GMT		BBC Report		Stadium: Cardiff City Stadium; Attendance: 15,287; Referee: Craig Pawson (South Yorkshire)
Note: Televised Live on Sky

31 October 2015 14	Ipswich	0–0	Cardiff City	Ipswich
15:00 GMT		BBC Report		Stadium: Portman Road; Attendance: 17,169; Referee: David Coote (Nottinghamshire)

3 November 2015 15	Leeds United	1–0	Cardiff City	Leeds
19:45 GMT	Mowatt 63'	BBC Report		Stadium: Elland Road; Attendance: 17,914; Referee: Carl Boyeson

7 November 2015 16	Cardiff City	2–0	Reading	Cardiff
15:00 GMT	Jones 44'; Connolly 53'	BBC Report		Stadium: Cardiff City Stadium; Attendance: 15,414; Referee: Keith Stroud (Hampshire)

21 November 2015 17	Derby County	2–0	Cardiff City	Derby
15:00 GMT	Thorne 55'; Weimann 76'	BBC Report		Stadium: Pride Park Stadium; Attendance: 29,526; Referee: Eddie Ilderton

28 November 2015 18	Cardiff City	2–2	Burnley	Cardiff
15:00 GMT	Gunnarsson 41'; Morrison 64'	BBC Report	85' Hennings; 90' (o.g.) Connolly	Stadium: Cardiff City Stadium; Attendance: 15,133; Referee: Darren Drysdale

5 December 2015 19	Bolton Wanderers	2–3	Cardiff City	Bolton
15:00 GMT	Madine 17'; Casado (red card) 90+1'; Dervite 71'	BBC Report	13' Watt; 53' Malone; 80' Pilkington	Stadium: Macron Stadium; Attendance: 13,241; Referee: Tony Harrington

12 December 2015 20	Cardiff City	2–2	Sheffield Wednesday	Cardiff
15:00 GMT	Noone 21' (pen.); Pilkington 34'	BBC Report	61' Forestieri; 61' Bannan	Stadium: Cardiff City Stadium; Attendance: 14,256; Referee: Charles Breakspear

15 December 2015 21	Cardiff City	3–2	Brentford	Cardiff
19:45 GMT	Watt 20'; Jones 34', 90+3'	Report	69' Bidwell; 86' Swift	Stadium: Cardiff City Stadium; Attendance: 12,729; Referee: Simon Hooper

18 December 2015 22	Birmingham City	1–0	Cardiff City	Birmingham
19:45 GMT	Caddis 45' (pen.)	BBC Report		Stadium: St Andrew's; Attendance: 14,414; Referee: David Coote (Note Coote was a late replacement for Keith Stroud)
Note: Televised Live on Sky

26 December 2015 23	Milton Keynes Dons	2–1	Cardiff City	Milton Keynes
15:00 GMT	Maynard 49'; Murphy 90'	Report	Noone 81'	Stadium: Stadium MK; Attendance: Iain Williamson; Referee: 12,510

29 December 2015 24	Cardiff City	1–1	Nottingham Forest	Cardiff
19:45 GMT	Gunnarsson 13'	Report	Burke 9'	Stadium: Cardiff City Stadium; Attendance: 15,461; Referee: Tim Robinson

2 January 2016 25	Cardiff City	1–0	Blackburn Rovers	Cardiff
15:00 GMT	Mason 58'	BBC Report		Stadium: Cardiff City Stadium; Attendance: 14,385; Referee: Andy Woolmer

13 January 2016 26	Hull City	2–0	Cardiff City	Hull
19:45 GMT	Hernández 40' (pen.); Clucas 51'	Report		Stadium: KC Stadium; Attendance: 15,549; Referee: Scott Duncan

16 January 2016 27	Wolverhampton Wanderers	1–3	Cardiff City	Wolverhampton
15:00 GMT	Zyro 40'	BBC Report	28', 36' Noone; 48' Ralls	Stadium: Molineux Stadium; Attendance: 24,238; Referee: Dean Whitestone

23 January 2016 28	Cardiff City	2–2	Rotherham United	Cardiff
15:00 GMT	Pilkington 25', 60'; Peltier (red card) 83'	BBC Report	Newell 44'; Pilkington 49' (o.g.)	Stadium: Cardiff City Stadium; Attendance: 14,885; Referee: Jeremy Simpson (Lancashire)

30 January 2016 29	Huddersfield	2–3	Cardiff City	Huddersfield
15:00 GMT	Wells 40'; Bunn 90+2'	BBC Report	Whittingham 37', 79'; Immers 61'	Stadium: John Smith's Stadium; Attendance: 11,002; Referee: David Webb (County Durham)

6 February 2016 30	Cardiff City	0–0	Milton Keynes Dons	Cardiff
15:00 GMT		BBC Report		Stadium: Cardiff City Stadium; Attendance: 13,833; Referee: Kevin Johnson

13 February 2016 31	Charlton Athletic	0–0	Cardiff City	London
15:00 GMT		Report	(yellow card) 90+6' (yellow-red card) Ameobi	Stadium: The Valley; Attendance: 16,755; Referee: Iain Williamson

20 February 2016 32	Cardiff City	4–1	Brighton & Hove Albion	Cardiff
12:30 GMT	Whittingham 16', 66' (pen.); Pilkington 19'; Immers 30'	BBC Report	Stephens 55'	Stadium: Cardiff City Stadium; Attendance: 14,143; Referee: Darren Bond (Lancashire)
Note: Televised Live on Sky

23 February 2016 33	Middlesbrough	3–1	Cardiff City	Middlesbrough
19:45 GMT	Connolly 25' (o.g.); Ramírez 63'; Nugent 83'	Report	20' Fábio	Stadium: The Riverside; Attendance: 24,322; Referee: Trevor Kettle

27 February 2016 34	Cardiff City	2–1	Preston North End	Cardiff
15:00 GMT	Pilkington 44' (pen.), 80' (pen.)	Report	87' Robinson	Stadium: Cardiff City Stadium; Attendance: 15,566; Referee: Brendan Malone

5 March 2016 35	Bristol City	0–2	Cardiff	Bristol
12:00 GMT		Report	Immers 21'; O'Keefe 83'	Stadium: Ashton Gate; Attendance: 15,758; Referee: Graham Scott (Oxfordshire)

8 March 2016 36	Cardiff City	0–2	Leeds United	Cardiff
19:45 GMT	Fábio (yellow card) 64' (yellow-red card)	Report	Doukara 37'; Antenucci 90+4'	Stadium: Cardiff City Stadium; Attendance: 15,273; Referee: Darren Deadman

12 March 2016 37	Cardiff City	1–0	Ipswich Town	Cardiff
15:00 GMT	Ecuele 18'	Report		Stadium: Cardiff City Stadium; Attendance: 15,175; Referee: Andy Madley (West Yorkshire)

19 March 2016 38	Reading	1–1	Cardiff City	Reading
15:00 GMT	McCleary 37'; John (yellow card) 45'	Report	Connolly (yellow card) 63'; Immers 65'; Pilkington (yellow card) 83'	Stadium: Madjeski Stadium; Attendance: 17,407; Referee: Darren Drysdale

2 April 2016 39	Cardiff City	2–1	Derby County	Cardiff
15:00 BST	Ecuele 37'; O'Keefe 68'	BBC Report	49' Martin	Stadium: Cardiff City Stadium; Attendance: 28,680; Referee: Chris Kavanagh (Manchester)

5 April 2016 40	Burnley	0–0	Cardiff City	Burnley
19:45 BST		BBC Report		Stadium: Turf Moor; Attendance: 15,740; Referee: Geoff Eltringham (Tyne and Wear)

9 April 2016 41	Fulham	2–1	Cardiff City	London
15:00 BST	Parker 46'; Hyndman 90+3'	BBC Sport	41' Immers	Stadium: Craven Cottage; Attendance: 17,149; Referee: Jeremy Simpson (Lancashire)

16 April 2016 42	Cardiff City	0–0	Queen's Park Rangers	Cardiff
15:00 BST		BBC Sport		Stadium: Cardiff City Stadium; Attendance: 27,874; Referee: Steve Martin (Staffordshire)

19 April 2016 43	Brentford	2–1	Cardiff City	London
19:45 BST	Hogan 83', 86'	BBC Report	89' Zohore	Stadium: Griffin Park; Attendance: 8,363; Referee: Stuart Attwell (Warwickshire)

23 April 2016 44	Cardiff City	2–1	Bolton Wanderers	Cardiff
15:00 BST	Zohore 55'; Whittingham 90+4' (pen.)	Report	7' Clough; (red card) 32' Maher	Stadium: Cardiff City Stadium; Attendance: 24,189; Referee: Lee Collins

30 April 2016 45	Sheffield Wed	3–0	Cardiff City	Sheffield
15:00 BST	Hooper 64', 90+4'; Peltier	Report		Stadium: Hillsborough; Attendance: 31,843; Referee: Paul Tierney (Lancashire)

7 May 2016 46	Cardiff City	1–1	Birmingham	Cardiff
12:30 BST	Connolly (yellow card) 19'; Pilkington 26'; Lawrence (yellow card) 31'; Whittingham (yellow card) 51'; Turner (yellow card) 60'	Report	Cotterill 11'; Spector (yellow card) 31'; Kieftenbeld (yellow card) 35'	Stadium: Cardiff City Stadium; Attendance: 21,022; Referee: Peter Bankes (Merseyside)

=== FA Cup ===
10 January 2016 Third Round	Cardiff City	0–1	Shrewsbury Town	Cardiff
18:00 GMT		Report	62' Mangan	Stadium: Cardiff City Stadium; Attendance: 4,782; Referee: Peter Bankes
Note: Televised Live on S4C

=== League Cup ===
11 August 2015 First round	Cardiff City	1–0	AFC Wimbledon	Cardiff
19:45 BST	Noone 45'	BBC Report		Stadium: Cardiff City Stadium; Attendance: 6,314; Referee: Brendan Malone

25 August 2015 Second round	MK Dons	2–1 (a.e.t.)	Cardiff City	Milton Keynes
19:45 BST	Baker 78'; Murphy 108'	BBC report	Revell 53'	Stadium: Stadium MK; Attendance: 5,617; Referee: Tim Robinson

== Development Team ==
Note: Flags indicate national team as defined under FIFA eligibility rules; some limited exceptions apply. Players may hold more than one non-FIFA nationality.

No.	Pos.	Nation	Player
45	MF	WAL	Theo Wharton
–	DF	FRA	Jordan Blaise
–	MF	WAL	MacAuley Southam
–	MF	WAL	Robbie Patten
–	DF	WAL	Tom James
–	MF	WAL	Tommy O'Sullivan (on loan to Newport County)
–	FW	ENG	Rhys Healey (on loan to Dundee United)
–	DF	ENG	Jazzi Barnum-Bobb
–	DF	WAL	Curtis Watkins
–	DF	COD	David Tutonda

No.	Pos.	Nation	Player
–	MF	WAL	Tyler Roche
—	DF	WAL	Ashley Baker
—	MF	WAL	Tom Burridge
—	FW	WAL	Abdi Noor
—	DF	WAL	Dylan Rees
—	MF	WAL	Jamie Veale
—	FW	WAL	Dane Griffiths
–	GK	WAL	Luke O'Reilly
—	FW	WAL	Eli Phipps
–	DF	BEL	Marco Weymans

== Overall summary ==
=== Summary ===
Games played	46 (35 Championship, 1 FA Cup, 2 League Cup)
Games won	16 (17 Championship, 0 FA Cup, 1 League Cup)
Games drawn	17 (17 Championship, 0 FA Cup, 0 League Cup)
Games lost	14 (12 Championship, 1 FA Cup, 1 League Cup)
Goals scored	57 (55 Championship, 0 FA Cup, 2 League Cup)
Goals conceded	53 (50 Championship, 1 FA Cup, 2 League Cup)
Goal difference	+4
Clean sheets	16 (15 Championship, 0 FA Cup, 1 League Cup)
Yellow cards	81 (79 Championship, 0 FA Cup, 2 League Cup)
Red cards	4 (4 Championship, 0 FA Cup, 0 League Cup)
Worst discipline	Fábio & Lee Peltier (9 (yellow card) , 1 (red card) )
Best result	W 4–1 vs Brighton & Hove Albion (20 February)
Worst result	L 2–0 vs Hull City (16 September); L 2–0 vs Derby County (21 November); L 2–0 vs Leeds United (8 March)
Most appearances	Matthew Connolly (45)
Top scorer	Anthony Pilkington (9)
Points	68

=== Score overview ===
Opposition	Home score	Away score	Double
Birmingham City	1–1	0–1	No
Blackburn Rovers	1–0	1–1	No
Bolton Wanderers	2–1	3–2	Yes
Brentford	3–2	1–2	No
Brighton & Hove Albion	4–1	1–1	No
Bristol City	0–0	2–0	No
Burnley	2–2	0–0	No
Charlton Athletic	2–1	0–0	No
Derby County	2–1	0–2	No
Fulham	1–1	1–2	No
Huddersfield Town	2–0	3–2	Yes
Hull City	0–2	0–2	No
Ipswich Town	1–0	0–0	No
Leeds United	0–2	0–1	No
Middlesbrough	1–0	1–3	No
Milton Keynes Dons	0–0	1–2	No
Nottingham Forest	1–1	2–1	No
Preston North End	2–1	0–0	No
Queens Park Rangers	0–0	2–2	No
Reading	2–0	1–1	No
Rotherham United	2–2	1–2	No
Sheffield Wednesday	2–2	0–3	No
Wolverhampton Wanderers	2–0	3–1	Yes

== Club staff ==
=== Backroom staff ===
Position	Name
First-team manager	(England) Russell Slade
Assistant manager	(Wales) Scott Young
Head coach	(Wales) Paul Trollope
Goalkeeper coach	(Wales) Martyn Margetson
First-team coach	(Wales) James Rowberry
Head of Medical	(Wales) Hywel Griffiths MCSP HCPC
First-team physiotherapist	(England) Adam Rattenberry MCSP SRP
Head of Fitness & Condition	(England) Lee Southernwood
Strength & Conditioning Coach	(Wales) Mike Beere
Club doctor	(Wales) Dr. Len Nokes
Performance & Recruitment Analyst	(England) Graham Younger
Opposition Analyst	(England) Martin Hodge
Kit & equipment manager	(England) Ian Lenning

=== Board of directors ===
Position	Name
Chairman	(Cyprus) Mehmet Dalman
General Manager	(Malaysia) Ken Choo
Finance Director	(Wales) Richard Thompson
Non-Executive; Board Members; Football Club	(Wales) Steve Borley (Malaysia) Derek Chee Seng Chin (Cyprus) Mehmet Dalman (England) Michael Filiou (Malaysia) Meng Kwong Lim (Wales) Michael Isaac (Malaysia) Vincent Lye Ek Seang
Non-Executive; Board Members; Cardiff City (Holdings)	(Malaysia) Danni Rais
Club Secretary	(England) David Beeby
