= Finlay Wood =

Welsh footballer

Personal information
- Date of birth: 15 February 1997 (age 29)
- Place of birth: Newport, Wales
- Position: Midfielder

Youth career
- –2016: Newport County

College career
Years	Team	Apps	(Gls)
2017–2022	San Jose State Spartans	81	(6)

Senior career*
Years	Team	Apps	(Gls)
2016–2017	Newport County	3	(0)
- * Club domestic league appearances and goals as of 2 January 2017 (UTC)

Finlay Wood (born 15 February 1997) is a Welsh football midfielder. He currently plays for San José State University.

== Career ==
Wood is a product of the Newport County academy. He made his senior debut for Newport in a 1–0 defeat to Yeovil Town in League Two on 15 October 2016 as a second-half substitute. Wood made his first appearance in the Newport starting line-up on 21 December 2016 in the FA Cup 2nd round replay versus Plymouth Argyle.

On 9 May 2017, Wood was released by Newport at the end of the 2016–17 season.

== Career statistics ==
As of 10 January 2017.

Club	Season	League			FA Cup		League Cup		Other		Total	
Club	Season	Division	Apps	Goals	Apps	Goals	Apps	Goals	Apps	Goals	Apps	Goals
Newport County	2016–17	League Two	3	0	2	0	0	0	1	0	6	0
Total			3	0	2	0	0	0	1	0	6	0
