= James Cotterill =

English footballer (born 1982)

Personal information
- Date of birth: 3 August 1982 (age 44)
- Place of birth: Barnsley, England
- Position: Central defender

Senior career*
Years	Team	Apps	(Gls)
2000–2003	Scunthorpe United	23	(0)
2003–2006	Barrow	115^{~}	(0)
2007–2008	Ossett Town	?	(?)
2008–2011	Guiseley	?	(?)
2010	→ Bradford Park Avenue (loan)	2	(0)
2012–2015	Ossett Town	?	(?)
2015–	Handsworth Parramore	?	(?)
- * Club domestic league appearances and goals as of 19:19, 1 March 2007 (UTC)^{~} Appearances in all competitions

James Cotterill (born 3 August 1982) is a former professional footballer. He plays as a central defender for Handsworth Parramore.

== Footballing career ==
He began his career at Scunthorpe United, and was released in 2003 after making 24 appearances for the first team. Following this, Cotterill joined Barrow in August 2003, where he remained until December 2006. He made 115 appearances in all competitions for Barrow.

On 1 March 2007, two weeks after his release from prison, Cotterill joined Northern Premier League side Ossett Town. During the 2007/08 season he joined Ossett's ex manager Steve Kittrick at local rivals Guiseley A.F.C.

He joined Bradford Park Avenue on a short-term loan in November 2010 making two appearances for the club.

He left Guiseley in February 2011 to look for regular first team football. He later re-signed for Ossett Town.

=== Assault conviction ===
On 11 November 2006, during an FA Cup first round match between Barrow and Bristol Rovers, Cotterill was involved in an off the ball incident with Rovers player Sean Rigg. Cotterill was seen to punch Rigg in the face, leaving him with a double fracture of the jaw, which was screened later that evening on Match of the Day. After the incident, Rigg was only able to eat with a teaspoon and drink through a straw, and his treatment involved the insertion of two metal plates into his jaw, which will remain permanently. Cotterill was banned from all football activity by The FA until March 2007, and on 11 January 2007 he was jailed for four months after pleading guilty to causing grievous bodily harm. An appeal to free Cotterill had failed, however, he was soon released from prison on 14 February 2007 although he was forced to wear an electronic tag in his home town Barnsley until 11 March 2007. Hoping to re-build his life, Cotterill also thanked the Barrow fans who helped release him. Cotterill also apologised to Sean Rigg saying he "never intended to hurt Sean".
