= Rhys Healey =

English footballer (born 1994)

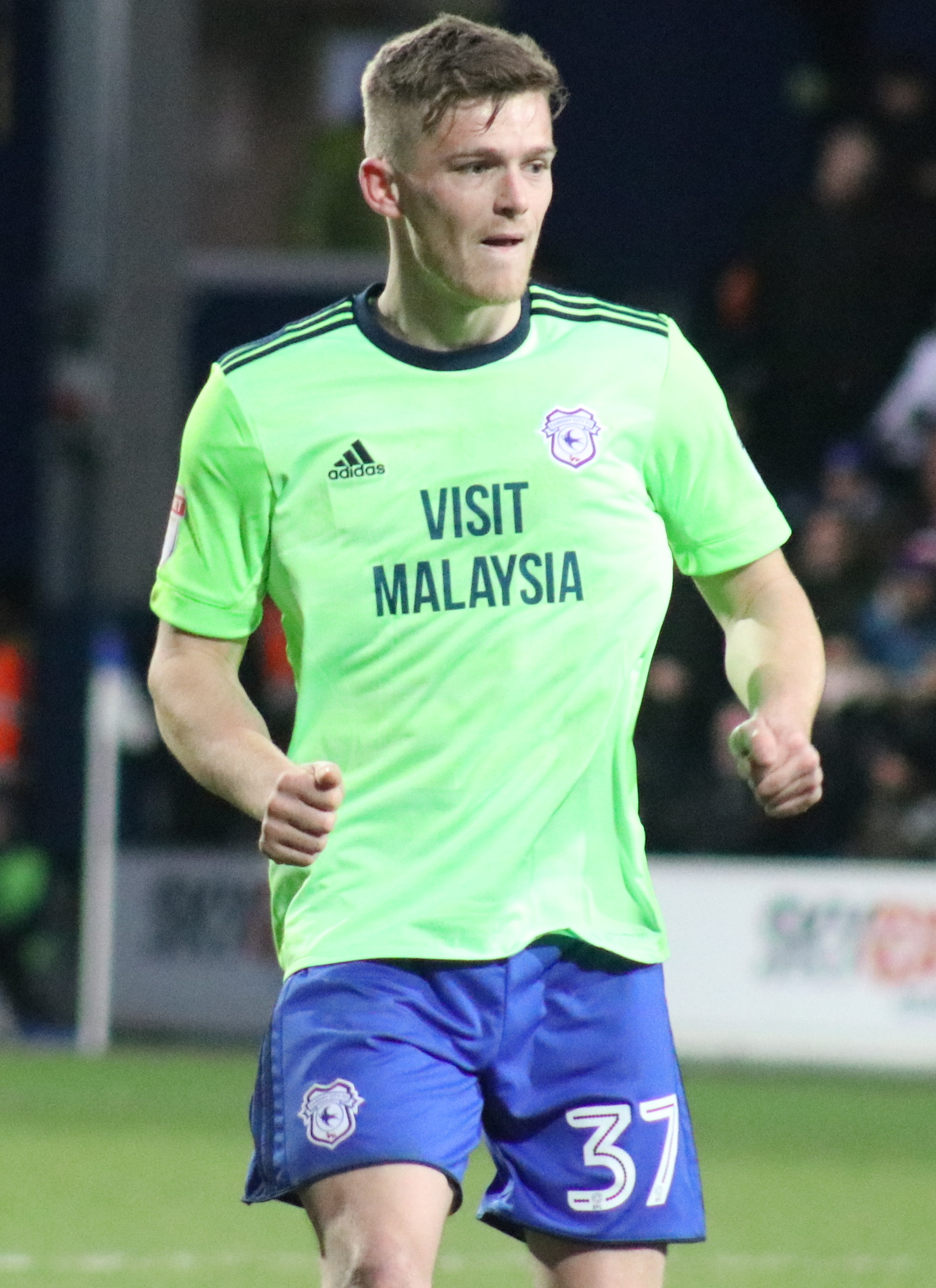
- Healey playing for Cardiff City in 2018

Personal information
- Full name: Rhys James Evitt-Healey
- Date of birth: 6 December 1994 (age 31)
- Place of birth: Manchester, England
- Height: 5 ft 11 in (1.80 m)
- Position: Forward

Team information
- Current team: Southport

Youth career
- 2009–2011: Connah's Quay Nomads

Senior career*
Years	Team	Apps	(Gls)
2011–2013	Connah's Quay Nomads	29	(15)
2013–2019	Cardiff City	14	(1)
2014–2015	→ Colchester United (loan)	17	(4)
2015	→ Colchester United (loan)	4	(0)
2015–2016	→ Dundee (loan)	7	(1)
2016–2017	→ Newport County (loan)	17	(6)
2018	→ Torquay United (loan)	8	(6)
2018–2019	→ Milton Keynes Dons (loan)	18	(8)
2019–2020	Milton Keynes Dons	19	(11)
2020–2023	Toulouse	69	(37)
2023	Toulouse B	2	(0)
2023–2024	Watford	11	(2)
2024–2026	Huddersfield Town	20	(4)
2025–2026	→ Barrow (loan)	1	(0)
2026–	Southport	0	(0)
- * Club domestic league appearances and goals as of 13:23, 24 September 2026 (UTC)

Rhys James Evitt-Healey (born 6 December 1994) is an English professional footballer who plays as a forward for National League North side Southport.

== Career ==
=== Connah's Quay Nomads ===
Healey started his career with Connah's Quay Nomads, joining their youth setup at Under-16 level in 2009. He made his first team debut for the club as a substitute during a 6–1 victory on the opening Cymru Alliance match of the 2011–12 season against Caersws and made 10 league appearances as the club won promotion to the Welsh Premier League. The following season, he made his debut in the Welsh Premier League, coming off the bench against Bangor City and went on to score 12 league goals for the club during the first half of the 2012–13 season. His prolific form saw him attract the attention of several clubs and Healey spent time on trial with Stoke City and Manchester City.

=== Cardiff City ===
On 28 January 2013, Healey signed for Cardiff City. In March 2014 he signed a new contract with the club. On 11 May, he made his first-team debut on the last day of the season, in a 2–1 defeat against Chelsea as a substitute in place of Craig Bellamy.

Healey signed on loan for EFL League One club Colchester United on 19 September 2014. He joined the club as back-up to first choice striker Freddie Sears, initially signing until 20 December. He made his debut as a substitute in the second half, and scored in a 3–0 win over Crewe Alexandra, which was followed with another in the next game, in a 4–2 loss at Preston North End. Having made ten appearances and scored four goals, his loan was extended until the end of the season. On 19 March 2015, Healey was recalled by his parent club. On 2 April, he was re-loaned to Colchester as a protracted loan move to EFL League Two club Newport County fell through after the move was blocked by FIFA, a decision that was branded unbelievable by Newport manager Jimmy Dack.

On 1 September 2015, Healey signed for Scottish Premiership club Dundee on loan until January. He made a total of 7 appearances for the club, scoring once during a 2–1 defeat to Kilmarnock, before his loan spell was ended early following an injury.

On 31 August 2016, Healey joined Newport County on loan until 3 January 2017. He made his debut on 10 September in League Two during a 2–2 draw with Cheltenham Town, coming on as a second-half substitute in place of Jon Parkin. He scored his first goal two weeks later in a 2–1 defeat to Cambridge United. His final appearance was in a 2–1 defeat to Wycombe Wanderers on 2 January.

Upon on returning, Healey found himself placed on the bench for Cardiff City for the first time in three years against Aston Villa. On 21 January, he scored the winner against Burton Albion, also his first for the Bluebirds, after replacing Junior Hoilett. During his second start for the club against Rotherham United on 18 February, Healey was forced off after suffering a serious knee injury, which ruled him out for up to nine months.

During his recovery from the injury, Healey signed a new two-and-a-half-year deal at Cardiff, before making his first team return on 26 December 2017, coming on for Loïc Damour against Fulham. He joined Torquay United on loan in March 2018 for the remainder of the 2017–18 season, scoring six times in eight appearances including a hat-trick during a 4–3 defeat at home to Guiseley.

On 24 August 2018, Healey joined EFL League Two club Milton Keynes Dons on loan until January. He scored his first goal for in an EFL Trophy tie against Peterborough United on 4 September.

=== Milton Keynes Dons ===
On 16 July 2019, Healey returned to former loan club Milton Keynes Dons on a permanent basis, signing for an undisclosed fee. In his first game back at the club, Healey scored a 93rd-minute winner in a 1–0 home victory over Shrewsbury Town. Despite missing several months of the season through injury, Healey finished the 2019–20 campaign as the club's top scorer with 12 goals in 20 appearances across all competitions, and was voted Players' Player of the Year by his teammates.

=== Toulouse ===
On 27 August 2020, Healey joined Ligue 2 club Toulouse for an undisclosed fee. He made his debut on 14 September when he replaced Efthymis Koulouris, in a league match versus Sochaux. A few days later, Healey scored his first goal in a 3–1 league win against Auxerre. Healey was named the UNFP Ligue 2 Player of the Month for December 2020 following an impressive run of six goals in five consecutive league games during the month.

On 20 November 2021, Healey scored all four goals in a 4–1 home league win over Sochaux. He was later named UNFP Ligue 2 Player of the Month for the second time, winning the November 2021 award. On 9 April 2022, Healey scored a hat-trick in a 4–2 away win over Guingamp.

At the conclusion of the 2021–22 season, in total Healey had scored 20 goals in 32 appearances, contributing to Toulouse achieving promotion back to Ligue 1 as champions. He finished the campaign as Ligue 2's top scorer, and was later chosen as one of six Toulouse players to feature in the UNFP Ligue 2 Team of the Year.

=== Watford ===
On 21 June 2023, Healey returned to England, signing for Championship club Watford on a two-year deal. He scored his first goal for the club in a 1–1 draw with Southampton on 9 December 2023.

=== Huddersfield Town ===
On 19 January 2024, Healey signed for fellow Championship club Huddersfield Town on a two-and-a-half year deal for an undisclosed fee.

In January 2026, he joined League Two club Barrow on loan for the remainder of the season.

On 2 June 2026, having not made an appearance for the club since February 2025, Healey departed Huddersfield Town by mutual consent.

=== Southport ===
On 18 September 2026, Healey joined National League North club Southport.

== Career statistics ==
As of end of 2025–26 season

Appearances and goals by club, season and competition
Club	Season	League			National cup (Note: Includes Welsh Cup, FA Cup, Coupe de France)		League cup (Note: Includes Welsh League Cup, EFL Cup)		Other		Total	
Club	Season	Division	Apps	Goals	Apps	Goals	Apps	Goals	Apps	Goals	Apps	Goals
Connah's Quay Nomads	2011–12	Cymru Alliance	10	3	2	2	0	0	0	0	12	5
Connah's Quay Nomads	2012–13	Welsh Premier League	19	12	0	0	2	2	0	0	21	14
Connah's Quay Nomads	Total		29	15	2	2	2	2	0	0	33	19
Cardiff City	2013–14	Premier League	1	0	0	0	0	0	—		1	0
Cardiff City	2014–15	Championship	0	0	—		—		—		0	0
Cardiff City	2015–16	Championship	0	0	0	0	0	0	—		0	0
Cardiff City	2016–17	Championship	7	1	—		0	0	—		7	1
Cardiff City	2017–18	Championship	3	0	2	0	0	0	—		5	0
Cardiff City	2018–19	Premier League	3	0	—		—		—		3	0
Cardiff City	Total		14	1	2	0	0	0	—		16	1
Colchester United (loan)	2014–15	League One	21	4	1	0	1	0	0	0	23	4
Dundee (loan)	2015–16	Scottish Premiership	7	1	0	0	0	0	0	0	7	1
Newport County (loan)	2016–17	League Two	17	6	4	1	0	0	2 (Note: Appearance(s) in EFL Trophy)	0	23	7
Torquay United (loan)	2017–18	National League	8	6	0	0	—		0	0	8	6
Milton Keynes Dons (loan)	2018–19	League Two	18	8	1	0	1	0	1	1	21	9
Milton Keynes Dons	2019–20	League One	18	11	0	0	1	1	1	0	20	12
Toulouse	2020–21	Ligue 2	33	15	1	0	—		2 (Note: Appearances in Ligue 1 relegation/promotion play-offs)	1	36	16
Toulouse	2021–22	Ligue 2	32	20	5	2	—		—		37	22
Toulouse	2022–23	Ligue 1	4	2	0	0	—		—		4	2
Toulouse	Total		69	37	6	2	—		2	1	77	40
Toulouse B	2022–23	National 3	2	0	—		—		—		2	0
Watford	2023–24	Championship	11	2	1	0	1	0	—		13	2
Huddersfield Town	2023–24	Championship	11	3	0	0	0	0	—		11	3
Huddersfield Town	2024–25	League One	9	1	0	0	0	0	2	1	11	2
Huddersfield Town	2025–26	League One	0	0	0	0	0	0	0	0	0	0
Huddersfield Town	Total		20	4	0	0	0	0	2	1	22	5
Barrow (loan)	2025–26	League Two	1	0	0	0	0	0	0	0	0	0
Career total			235	95	17	5	6	3	8	3	265	106

== Honours ==
Connah's Quay Nomads

- Cymru Alliance: 2011–12

Milton Keynes Dons

- EFL League Two third-place promotion: 2018–19

Toulouse

- Ligue 2: 2021–22
- Coupe de France: 2022–23

Individual

- Milton Keynes Dons Players' Player of the Year: 2019–20
- UNFP Player of the Month Ligue 2: December 2020, November 2021, April 2022
- Ligue 2 Top Scorer: 2021–22
- UNFP Ligue 2 Team of the Year: 2021–22
