= Liam Angel =

Welsh footballer (born 1999)

Personal information
- Full name: Liam Paul Angel
- Date of birth: 17 March 1999 (age 27)
- Place of birth: Wales
- Position: Defender

Team information
- Current team: Pontypridd

Youth career
- –2014: Cardiff City
- 2014–2015: Newport County

Senior career*
Years	Team	Apps	(Gls)
2015–2017	Newport County	0	(0)
2017–	Cinderford Town		
2022–2024	Merthyr Town		
2024–2025	Marine		
2025–	Pontypridd		

International career
- Wales U17
- Wales U19
- * Club domestic league appearances and goals as of 9 May 2017 (UTC)

Liam Paul Angel (born 17 March 1999) is a Welsh football defender who plays for Pontypridd.

== Early life ==
As a teenager, Angel attended Pontllanfraith Comprehensive School.

== Career ==
Angel was a member of the Cardiff City academy and captained the club's under-16 side but was released at the age of 16 after not being offered a scholarship. In 2015, he joined the academy of Football League Two side Newport County, manager Terry Butcher describing Angel as having "a sweet left foot for a defender and he's a good talker as well". He signed his first professional contract with Newport County in February 2016. Angel made his senior debut for Newport at the age of 17 on 30 August 2016 in a 4–1 defeat to Plymouth Argyle in the first round of the EFL Trophy

On 9 May 2017 Angel was released by Newport at the end of the 2016–17 season. He later joined Cinderford Town.

== International ==
Angel was part of the winning Wales under-16 squad in the Victory Shield in November 2014, scoring the only goal of the game in a 1–0 victory over England. In 2015, he was called into the Wales Under 17 squad and in August 2016 for the Wales Under 19 squad.

== Career statistics ==
As of 30 August 2016

Club	Season	League			FA Cup		League Cup		Other (Note: Includes other competitive competitions, including the EFL Trophy)		Total	
Club	Season	Division	Apps	Goals	Apps	Goals	Apps	Goals	Apps	Goals	Apps	Goals
Newport County	2016–17	League Two	0	0	0	0	0	0	1	0	1	0
Total			0	0	0	0	0	0	1	0	1	0
