= Lewis Bamford =

Welsh footballer

Personal information
- Full name: Lewis Paul Bamford
- Date of birth: 23 November 1997 (age 28)
- Place of birth: Newport, Wales
- Position: Midfielder

Team information
- Current team: Bristol Manor Farm

Youth career
- –2015: Newport County

Senior career*
Years	Team	Apps	(Gls)
2015–2017	Newport County	1	(0)
2017–2018	Cinderford Town	-	(-)
2018-	Bristol Manor Farm	-	(-)
- * Club domestic league appearances and goals as of 9 September 2019 21:18 (UTC)

Lewis Paul Bamford is a Welsh football midfielder who plays for Cinderford Town.

== Career ==
Bamford was born in Newport and started his football career in the Newport County A.F.C. academy. He made his senior debut for Newport in their League Two match against Dagenham & Redbridge on 19 September 2015 as a second-half substitute. The match ended in a 0–0 draw.

In December 2016 Newport County confirmed Bamford would be released by Newport at the conclusion of his contract on 31 January 2017.

In 2017 Bamford joined Cinderford Town, who play in the Southern League Division One South.

In 2018 he switched to Cinderford's division rivals, Bristol Manor Farm.
