= Marco Weymans =

Belgian footballer

Personal information
- Date of birth: 9 July 1997 (age 29)
- Place of birth: Edegem, Belgium
- Height: 1.75 m (5 ft 9 in)
- Positions: Left back; left midfielder

Youth career
- –2012: Beerschot
- 2012–2015: PSV
- 2015–2017: Cardiff City

Senior career*
Years	Team	Apps	(Gls)
2017–2019	Tubize	39	(3)
2019–2021	Östersunds FK	39	(1)
2022–2026	Beerschot	78	(3)

International career^{‡}
2012	Belgium U15	3	(0)
2013–2014	Belgium U17	13	(1)
2014–2015	Belgium U18	3	(1)
2014–2016	Belgium U19	13	(1)
2020–	Burundi	8	(0)
- * Club domestic league appearances and goals as of 19 April 2026 ‡ National team caps and goals as of 1 June 2023

Marco Weymans (born 9 July 1997) is a professional football player. Born in Belgium, Weymans represents the Burundi national team.

== Club career ==
Having begun his career with Beerschot and PSV, Weymans spent time on trial with Fulham before signing for Welsh side Cardiff City in 2015 on a three-year contract.

He joined Tubize in 2017 and made his Belgian First Division B debut for the side on 20 August 2017 in a game against Beerschot Wilrijk., and made his debut for the Burundi national team in 2020.

With one and a half seasons of professional football under his belt, he signed a contract with Swedish first division club Östersunds FK in January 2019. In his first season, he played in 14 of their 30 league matches.

After his contract with Östersunds expired in early 2022, Weymans was without a club for a while. In April 2022 it was announced that Weymans joined the training of Beerschot VA to maintain his condition, the club had just been relegated from the top Belgian division. On 24 June 2022, Beerschot announced that Weymans had managed to convince the club to offer him a contract: he signed for one season with an option for an additional year. Weymans thus returned to the club where it all started for him.

In 2024, he helped Beerschot to promotion back to the Jupiler Pro League after two seasons away, with Dirk Kuyt as head coach.

== International career ==
Weymans was born in Belgium to a Belgian father and Burundian mother. Weymans represented Belgium at several youth levels, the last being at under-19 level. He scored one goal for the side, from the halfway line during a match against Sweden in March 2015.

Weymans debuted for the Burundi national team in a 1–1 2021 Africa Cup of Nations qualification tie with Mauritania on 11 November 2020.

== Honours ==
Beerschot

- First Division B/Challenger Pro League: 2023–24
