= Sean Rigg =

English footballer

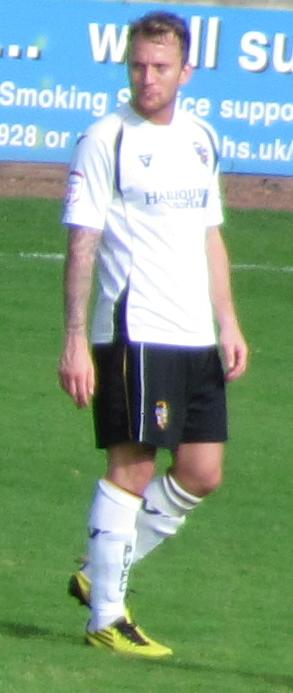
- Rigg playing for Port Vale in 2010

Personal information
- Full name: Sean Michael Rigg
- Date of birth: 1 October 1988 (age 38)
- Place of birth: Wotton-under-Edge, England
- Height: 5 ft 9 in (1.75 m)
- Positions: Winger; striker

Youth career
- 2003–2004: Forest Green Rovers
- 2004–2006: Bristol Academy of Sport

Senior career*
Years	Team	Apps	(Gls)
2006–2010	Bristol Rovers	57	(2)
2008	→ Grays Athletic (loan)	6	(0)
2009	→ Forest Green Rovers (loan)	14	(6)
2009–2010	→ Port Vale (loan)	4	(1)
2010	→ Port Vale (loan)	22	(2)
2010–2012	Port Vale	67	(13)
2012–2014	Oxford United	72	(7)
2014–2016	AFC Wimbledon	83	(7)
2016–2018	Newport County	50	(6)
2018–2019	Bath City	34	(8)
Total		409	(52)
- * Club domestic league appearances and goals

Sean Michael Rigg (born 1 October 1988) is an English former professional footballer who played as a winger or forward. In a 13-year career in the English Football League and National League, he scored 57 goals in 477 league and cup appearances.

Having graduated through the Bristol Academy of Sport, his professional career began at Bristol Rovers in 2006. He recovered from a broken jaw sustained in November 2006 to become a first-team regular in 2006–07, also appearing in the club's play-off final victory. He retained his place in the club's subsequent 2007–08 League One campaign, though he lost his place in 2008–09, and was instead sent out on loan at Conference club Grays Athletic. He started the 2009–10 season on loan at Conference side Forest Green Rovers before he joined Port Vale on a loan deal that was made permanent in January 2010. He switched to Oxford United in May 2012, where he stayed for two seasons. He signed with AFC Wimbledon in May 2014, but was released a day after he was an unused substitute in the club's League Two play-off final victory in May 2016. He joined Newport County in June 2016 and stayed with the club for one and a half seasons. He joined a part-time club Bath City in February 2018 to pursue a new career as a tattoo artist and retired from football completely in May 2019.

== Career ==
=== Bristol Rovers ===
Rigg joined the Bristol Rovers-backed Bristol Academy of Sport at Filton College in 2004 and earned his first professional contract in the summer of 2006. He made his league debut on 19 August 2006, coming on as a substitute in the second half against Milton Keynes Dons. The next month, he signed a new deal to keep him at Rovers until summer 2008.

On 11 November 2006, he suffered a double fracture of the jaw after being punched in an FA Cup first-round match by Barrow defender James Cotterill. The match and incident were televised. Rigg had to drink through a straw and eat with a teaspoon following the attack. Cotterill was later jailed for four months for the assault, and suspended from football by The FA, having pleaded guilty to grievous bodily harm. Rigg managed to recover to match fitness within six weeks, having had a plate put in to help speed up the healing process.

"I didn't aggravate Cotterill in any way for him to react like that. But it happened and he broke my jaw in two places."

— Rigg was shocked by the assault.

By January, he returned to the first team and helped Rovers to a play-off place. He then scored against Lincoln City in a 7–4 aggregate win at the play-off semi-final, and made an appearance as a substitute against Shrewsbury Town in the final; the game was won 3–1, and Rovers were promoted into League One. Rigg was named Bristol Rovers Young Player of the Year. A regular in the 2007–08 season, he scored his first senior goal in a 1–1 home draw with Northampton Town on 12 March, and finished the campaign with 38 appearances to his name.

Rigg joined Conference National side Grays Athletic on a one-month loan in September 2008. He played six games at the New Recreation Ground. At the end of the season Paul Trollope placed Rigg on the transfer list, having used Rigg only ten times in 2008–09.

In August 2009, Rigg signed for Forest Green Rovers, a club where he had spent some time as a youth player, on a one-month loan. He scored six minutes into his debut for Forest Green against Rushden & Diamonds. The loan was extended for a further month and Rigg enjoyed a rich vein of scoring form, scoring seven goals in 19 games.

=== Port Vale ===
In November 2009, he signed on loan to Port Vale until January 2010, joining "Pirates" teammate Lewis Haldane. His opener at Grimsby Town gave manager Micky Adams food for thought over whether to sign Rigg permanently in the January 2010 transfer window. He returned to Rovers in January, though later in the month he returned to Vale Park on loan until the end of the season, where he and Marc Richards began to develop a lethal strike partnership. In all he scored three goals in 26 appearances for the club. Attempting to keep the "nucleus" of his side together, Adams offered Rigg a permanent two-year deal at Vale Park at the end of the season.

"I like playing up the middle, but I also like to come deep to get the ball and try to create things."

— A self-assessment from Sean Rigg.

Along with 14 other players, he was released by Rovers at the end of the 2009–10 season. He was offered a full contract at Port Vale, and became the seventh player to commit his future to Port Vale in May 2010, his contract expiring in the summer of 2012. For the 2010–11 season he set himself a target of 20 goals. However, Adams started using the young striker as a winger, and Rigg adapted well to the position. He ended the season with five goals in 33 appearances, falling short of his pre-season target of twenty goals.

He started 2011–12 in fine form, bagging two against Barnet at Underhill, the first of which, a long-range effort, he described as the best of his career. However, he lost his first-team spot after missing a month due to a hamstring injury. He made his return in October, and added his fifth of the season at former club Bristol Rovers. Despite remaining Vale's second-highest scorer, he did not start a game in the last six weeks of 2011 and had to make do with seven substitute appearances; though he did add a further two goals to his tally from the bench, before admitting that the club's lack of activity during the January transfer window would give him a chance to win back his first-team place. The club entered administration in March, but Rigg rejected a move up a division to Exeter City as almost all of his teammates stayed loyal to the struggling Burslem club. He finished the season with ten goals in 45 appearances.

=== Oxford United ===
In May 2012, he signed a two-year contract with Oxford United, who had just missed out on a place in the League Two play-offs; manager Chris Wilder admitted that "Sean is a player we have been watching for a while now". In moving to the Kassam Stadium he received a pay rise, as well as a "fresh start". He stated he was hopeful of winning promotion in his first season at the club. He was nominated for the League Two Player of the Month award in December 2012. Rigg ended the 2012–13 campaign with seven goals in his 53 appearances. He made 32 appearances for the "Yellows" in the 2013–14 season, scoring two goals, before being released in the summer by manager Gary Waddock.

=== AFC Wimbledon ===
In May 2014, he signed for Neal Ardley's League Two side AFC Wimbledon. He marked his debut for the "Dons" with a goal in a 2–2 draw with Shrewsbury Town at Kingsmeadow on 9 August. He scored seven goals in 52 appearances in the 2014–15 season, but said the team under-achieved by finishing in mid-table. He made 44 appearances in the 2015–16 season, and was an unused substitute in the play-off final victory over Plymouth Argyle at Wembley Stadium that won Wimbledon promotion into League One. He was released from the club the day after promotion was secured.

=== Newport County ===
Rigg joined League Two club Newport County on a two-year contract in June 2016. He made his debut for the "Exiles" on 6 August, in a 3–2 defeat to Mansfield Town at Rodney Parade on the opening day of the 2016–17 season. He scored his first goal for Newport with a header two weeks later, to secure a 1–1 draw with Crewe Alexandra. He missed three weeks in January with a hamstring injury. Newport were 11 points from safety in last place in the table when manager Graham Westley was sacked in March. Still, Rigg said the players were now playing with "no pressure". Caretaker manager Michael Flynn steered the club out of the relegation zone on the last day of the season. Rigg lost his first-team place in October of the 2017–18 season. He failed to make it onto the bench after Christmas after Flynn criticised his fitness levels and consistency. On 5 February 2018, Rigg left Newport after his contract was cancelled by mutual consent.

=== Bath City ===
On 6 February 2018, Rigg signed an 18-month contract with National League South part-time club Bath City, which would allow him the chance to work as a tattoo artist. He scored two goals in seven appearances in the second half of the 2017–18 campaign, helping Jerry Gill's "Romans" to a ninth-place finish. He scored six goals in 27 games in the 2018–19 season as Bath finished in the play-offs, but lost to Wealdstone at the quarter-final stage. Rigg announced his retirement from the game in May 2019.

== Style of play ==
He preferred to play as a striker, though was also comfortable as a winger.

== Personal and later life ==
In January 2011, Rigg began training to become a tattooist, and Port Vale teammate Lewis Haldane allowed him to practice his tattooing techniques on him. Later in the year his fiancée gave birth to a baby daughter. He opened a tattoo studio in Stroud in 2026.

== Career statistics ==
Appearances and goals by club, season and competition
Club	Season	League			FA Cup		EFL Cup		Other		Total	
Club	Season	Division	Apps	Goals	Apps	Goals	Apps	Goals	Apps	Goals	Apps	Goals
Bristol Rovers	2006–07	League Two	18	1	2	0	1	0	5 (Note: 2 appearances in the Football League Trophy, 3 appearances and 1 goal in the play-offs.)	1	26	2
Bristol Rovers	2007–08	League One	31	1	5	0	1	0	1 (Note: Appearance(s) in the Football League Trophy / EFL Trophy.)	0	38	1
Bristol Rovers	2008–09	League One	8	0	0	0	1	0	1	0	10	0
Bristol Rovers	2009–10	League One	0	0	0	0	1	0	0	0	1	0
Bristol Rovers	Total		57	2	7	0	4	0	7	1	75	3
Grays Athletic (loan)	2008–09	Conference National	6	0	0	0	—		0	0	6	0
Forest Green Rovers (loan)	2009–10	Conference National	14	6	2	0	—		0	0	16	6
Port Vale	2009–10	League Two	26	3	0	0	—		—		26	3
Port Vale	2010–11	League Two	25	3	4	1	2	1	2	0	33	5
Port Vale	2011–12	League Two	42	10	2	0	1	0	0	0	45	10
Port Vale	Total		93	16	6	1	3	1	2	0	104	18
Oxford United	2012–13	League Two	44	5	4	1	2	0	3	1	53	7
Oxford United	2013–14	League Two	28	2	3	0	1	0	0	0	32	2
Oxford United	Total		72	7	7	1	3	0	3	1	85	9
AFC Wimbledon	2014–15	League Two	44	5	4	1	1	0	3	1	52	7
AFC Wimbledon	2015–16	League Two	39	2	1	0	1	0	3 (Note: 1 appearance in the Football League Trophy, 2 appearances in the play-offs.)	0	44	2
AFC Wimbledon	Total		83	7	5	1	2	0	6	1	96	9
Newport County	2016–17	EFL League Two	34	6	3	0	1	0	2	0	40	6
Newport County	2017–18	EFL League Two	16	0	1	0	1	0	3	0	21	0
Newport County	Total		50	6	4	0	2	0	5	0	61	6
Bath City	2017–18	National League South	7	2	0	0	—		0	0	7	2
Bath City	2018–19	National League South	27	6	0	0	—		0	0	27	6
Bath City	Total		34	8	0	0	0	0	0	0	34	8
Career total			409	52	31	3	14	1	23	3	477	59

== Honours ==
Bristol Rovers

- Football League Two play-offs: 2007

AFC Wimbledon

- Football League Two play-offs: 2016
