= Jazzi Barnum-Bobb =

Vincentian and Grenadinian footballer

Personal information
- Full name: Jazzi Barnum-Bobb
- Date of birth: 15 September 1995 (age 31)
- Place of birth: Enfield, England
- Height: 1.75 m (5 ft 9 in)
- Position: Defender

Team information
- Current team: Billericay Town
- Number: 2

Youth career
- 2012–2014: Watford

Senior career*
Years	Team	Apps	(Gls)
2014–2016	Cardiff City	0	(0)
2015	→ Newport County (loan)	12	(0)
2016–2018	Newport County	27	(1)
2017–2018	→ Torquay United (loan)	7	(0)
2018–2019	Chelmsford City	31	(0)
2019–2020	Wrexham	10	(0)
2020–2021	Dartford	17	(0)
2021–2022	Dulwich Hamlet	22	(0)
2022–2024	Chelmsford City	65	(1)
2024	Hornchurch	8	(0)
2024–2025	Chelmsford City	24	(1)
2025–	Billericay Town	20	(0)

International career^{‡}
2022–	Saint Vincent and the Grenadines	8	(0)
- * Club domestic league appearances and goals as of 17:10, 26 April 2026 (UTC) ‡ National team caps and goals as of 00:30, 27 March 2025 (UTC)

Jazzi Barnum-Bobb (born 15 September 1995) is a footballer who plays as a defender for Billericay Town. Born in England, he plays for the Saint Vincent and the Grenadines national team.

== Club career ==
=== Early career ===
Born in Enfield, London, Barnum-Bobb was signed for Watford's academy, spending two years there before being released in 2014. During his time at Watford, he achieved 11 A* GCSE passes from the highly rated Harefield Academy in Uxbridge.

=== Cardiff City ===
After being released from Watford, Barnum-Bobb was signed by Cardiff City on a one-year junior contract by manager Ole Gunnar Solskjær in the summer of 2014. Barnum-Bobb made his debut for the club against Coventry City in the League Cup in August 2014. He started the match and played 66 minutes before being substituted for Mats Møller Dæhli as Cardiff won 2–1. On 13 October 2015 he joined Newport County on an initial one-month loan, subsequently extended until 7 January 2016. He made his Football League debut for Newport on 17 October 2015 in a League Two match versus Portsmouth. At the end of the 2015–16 season, Barnum-Bobb was not offered a new contract by Cardiff and was subsequently released.

=== Newport County ===
On 23 June 2016, it was announced that Barnum-Bobb would rejoin Newport County on a one-year contract. He scored his first senior career goal on 29 October 2016 for Newport County in a 3–1 win against Accrington Stanley. At the end of the 2016–17 season his contract was extended for a further year.

On 8 November 2017, Barnum-Bobb joined Torquay United on loan until January 2018. He was released by Newport on 21 February 2018.

=== Non-League ===
On 5 March 2018, Barnum-Bobb joined Chelmsford City.

In June 2019, Barnum-Bobb went on trial with Wrexham. On 22 July 2019, he signed a one-year deal with the Welsh club.

Ahead of the 2020–21 season, Barnum-Bobb signed for Dartford. The following season, Barnum-Bobb moved to fellow National League South outfit Dulwich Hamlet. On 2 July 2022, Barnum-Bobb re-signed for former club Chelmsford City. On 11 June 2024, Chelmsford announced Barnum-Bobb had left the club for a second time.

On 12 June 2024, Barnum-Bobb joined fellow National League South side Hornchurch.

On 23 November 2024, Barnum-Bobb returned to Chelmsford City for his third spell at the club.

On 11 June 2025, Barnum-Bobb signed for Essex rivals Billericay Town.

== International career ==
Barnum-Bobb qualifies to play for Saint Vincent and the Grenadines via his father, who was born on the islands. On 6 June 2022, he made his international debut in a 2–2 draw with Nicaragua.

== Career statistics ==
As of match played 25 April 2026

Appearances and goals by club, season and competition
Club	Season	League			FA Cup		League Cup		Other		Total	
Club	Season	Division	Apps	Goals	Apps	Goals	Apps	Goals	Apps	Goals	Apps	Goals
Cardiff City	2014–15	Championship	0	0	0	0	2	0	0	0	2	0
Cardiff City	2015–16	Championship	0	0	0	0	0	0	0	0	0	0
Cardiff City	Total		0	0	0	0	2	0	0	0	2	0
Newport County (loan)	2015–16	League Two	12	0	2	0	0	0	0	0	14	0
Newport County	2016–17	League Two	26	1	4	1	1	0	3 (Note: Appearances in EFL Trophy)	1	34	3
Newport County	2017–18	League Two	1	0	0	0	0	0	2	0	3	0
Newport County	Total		39	1	6	1	1	0	5	1	51	3
Torquay United (loan)	2017–18	National League	7	0	0	0	—		1	0	8	0
Chelmsford City	2017–18	National League South	11	0	0	0	–		0	0	11	0
Chelmsford City	2018–19	National League South	20	0	0	0	–		0	0	20	0
Chelmsford City	Total		31	0	0	0	–		0	0	31	0
Wrexham	2019–20	National League	10	0	0	0	–		3 (Note: Appearance(s) in FA Trophy)	0	13	0
Dartford	2020–21	National League South	17	0	1	0	–		1	0	19	0
Dulwich Hamlet	2021–22	National League South	22	0	1	0	–		2 (Note: Appearance(s) in London Senior Cup)	0	25	0
Chelmsford City	2022–23	National League South	36	0	3	0	–		3 (Note: Appearance(s) in National League South Play-offs)	0	42	0
Chelmsford City	2023–24	National League South	29	1	1	0	–		2	0	32	1
Chelmsford City	Total		65	1	4	0	–		5	0	74	1
Hornchurch	2024–25	National League South	8	0	0	0	–		0	0	8	0
Chelmsford City	2024–25	National League South	24	1	0	0	–		0	0	24	1
Billericay Town	2025–26	Isthmian League Premier Division	20	0	0	0	–		1 (Note: Appearance(s) in Velocity Cup)	0	21	0
Career total			243	3	12	1	3	0	18	1	276	5
