= Tom Meechan =

English footballer

Personal information
- Full name: Thomas Meechan
- Place of birth: Cambridge, England
- Position: Striker

Team information
- Current team: Croesyceiliog

Senior career*
Years	Team	Apps	(Gls)
2010–2012	Swavesey Institute	28	(31)
2012–2013	Over Sports	21	(20)
2013–2014	St Ives Town		
2014–2015	Godmanchester Rovers	37	(34)
2015–2016	St Neots Town	?	(21)
2016–2017	Newport County	3	(0)
2016–2017	→ Weston-super-Mare (loan)	9	(0)
2017	→ Hungerford Town (loan)	15	(0)
2017–2018	Hungerford Town	11	(0)
2017	→ St Neots Town (loan)	13	(5)
2018	St Neots Town	4	(2)
2018–2020	Merthyr Town	19	(10)
2020–2025	Cwmbran Celtic		
2025	Goytre	9	(5)
2025–2026	Treowen Stars	18	(3)
2026–	Croesyceiliog	8	(6)
- * Club domestic league appearances and goals as of 10:56, 16 November 2026 (UTC)

Thomas Meechan is an English footballer who plays as a striker for Ardal South East club Croesyceiliog.

== Personal life ==
Meechan completed a sports and exercise degree at the University of Birmingham and subsequently worked as a maths teacher in Cambridgeshire, and later Cardiff after completing a PGCE, whilst playing non-league football for Godmanchester Rovers and St Neots Town. He also teaches at Wyedean school.

== Career ==
In 2012, Meechan rose to prominence in non-league football by scoring prolifically in the Kershaw Premier Division of the Cambridgeshire County Football League. He appeared sporadically over three seasons for Swavesey Institute whilst studying in the area before joining Over Sports in 2012, where he scored 20 league goals in 21 league appearances. His goal scoring exploits saw him attract attention from several clubs, including Cambridge City and Royston Town, and he eventually moved up The Football League pyramid to join St Ives Town. However he suffered an injury hit season and was unable to establish himself in the side and left at the end of the season to join Godmanchester Rovers.

After scoring 53 goals for Godmanchester, including 34 in the league, in his only season at the club, Meechan was handed another opportunity at a higher level and went on to score 21 for St Neots Town.

His prolific form saw him attract interest from Football League clubs and he was signed by Newport County on 18 February 2016 at the age of 25. Meechan made his football league debut for Newport in a League Two match versus Accrington Stanley on 28 March 2016 as a second-half substitute. Accrington won the match 2–0.

On 2 August 2016, Meechan joined Weston-super-Mare on loan until 31 January 2017. He made his debut for the club on the opening day of the 2016–17 season, coming on as a substitute in place of Jake Mawford during a 3–1 victory over Whitehawk. On 23 February 2017 Meechan joined Hungerford Town on loan until the end of the 2016–17 season.

On 9 May 2017 Meechan was released by Newport at the end of the 2016–17 season. He later returned to Hungerford on a permanent deal.

In January 2020 Meechan joined Cwmbran Celtic. In January 2025 he left Cwmbran Celtic and joined Goytre. He joined Treowen Stars in the summer of 2025. On 18 March 2026 Croesyceiliog announced they had signed Meechan.
