= Cardiff City F.C. Player of the Year =

Cardiff City F.C. award

The Cardiff City F.C. Player of the Year award is voted for annually by Cardiff City's supporters, in recognition of the best overall performance by an individual player throughout the football season. The award was set up by the Cardiff City Supporters' Club during the 1997–98 season.

== Voting mechanism ==
The fans of Cardiff City Football Club vote for the Player of the Year. Towards the end of the season, the fans are invited to vote either by post, by the hand where it is handed into the Supporter Club's shop or by e-mail. The fans get three choices and each of their choices get points based on their position on the voting slip, 1st = 3 points, 2nd = 2 points and 3rd = 1 point. The fans can also vote for the Young Player of the Year as well.

== List of winners ==
Players in bold are still at the club.

| Season | Player | Position | Nationality | Caps | Notes |
|---|---|---|---|---|---|
| 1995 | David Williams | Goalkeeper | England | — | Won the award in his first season with Cardiff |
| 1998 | Jon Hallworth | Forward | England | — | Won the award in his first season with Cardiff |
| 1999 | Kevin Nugent | Forward | England | — | |
| 2000 | Andy Legg | Midfielder/Defender | Wales | 5 | |
| 2001 | Andy Legg | Midfielder | Wales | 6 | **Second Award** |
| 2002 | Graham Kavanagh | Midfielder | Republic of Ireland | 8 | |
| 2003 | Robert Earnshaw | Forward | Wales | 11 | |
| 2004 | Tony Vidmar | Defender | Australia | 76 | |
| 2005 | Chris Barker | Defender | England | — | |
| 2006 | Jason Koumas | Midfielder | Wales | 24 | |
| 2007 | Michael Chopra | Forward | England | — | |
| 2008 | Roger Johnson | Defender | England | — | |
| 2009 | Roger Johnson | Defender | England | — | **Second Award** |
| 2010 | Peter Whittingham | Midfielder | England | — | |
| 2011 | Kevin McNaughton | Defender | Scotland | 4 | |
| 2012 | Peter Whittingham | Midfielder | England | — | **Second Award** |
| 2013 | Mark Hudson | Defender | England | — | |
| 2014 | David Marshall | Goalkeeper | Scotland | 11 | |
| 2015 | Bruno Ecuele Manga | Defender | Gabon | 41 | Won the award in his first season with Cardiff |
| 2016 | Matthew Connolly | Defender | England | — | |
| 2017 | Aron Gunnarsson | Midfielder | Iceland | 70 | |
| 2018 | Sean Morrison | Defender | England | — | |
| 2019 | Neil Etheridge | Goalkeeper | Philippines | 62 | |
| 2020 | Lee Tomlin | Midfielder | England | — | |
| 2021 | Kieffer Moore | Forward | Wales | 18 | Won the award in his first season with Cardiff |
| 2022 | Cody Drameh | Defender | England | — | Won the award whilst on loan with Cardiff |
| 2023 | **Perry Ng** | Defender | England | — | |
| 2024 | **Perry Ng** | Defender | England | — | **Second Award** |
| 2025 | **Callum Robinson** | Forward | Republic of Ireland | — | |
| 2026 | **Ryan Wintle** | Midfielder | England | — | |

=== Summary of wins by nationality ===
| Nationality | Number of winners |
|---|---|
| England | 17 |
| Wales | 5 |
| Scotland | 2 |
| Republic of Ireland | 2 |
| Australia | 1 |
| Gabon | 1 |
| Iceland | 1 |
| Philippines | 1 |

== Young Player of the Year ==
Players in bold are still at the club.

| Season | Player | Position | Nationality | Caps | Notes |
|---|---|---|---|---|---|
| 1998 | Christian Roberts | Midfielder | Wales | — | Won the award in his first season with Cardiff |
| 1999 | Robert Earnshaw | Forward | Wales | — | |
| 2000 | Robert Earnshaw | Forward | Wales | — | **Second Award** |
| 2001 | Robert Earnshaw | Forward | Wales | — | **Third Award** |
| 2002 | Danny Gabbidon | Defender | Wales | 1 | |
| 2003 | James Collins | Defender | Wales | — | |
| 2004 | James Collins | Defender | Wales | 2 | **Second Award** |
| 2005 | Joe Ledley | Midfielder | Wales | — | |
| 2006 | Joe Ledley | Midfielder | Wales | 1 | **Second Award** |
| 2007 | Chris Gunter | Defender | Wales | 1 | |
| 2008 | Aaron Ramsey | Midfielder | Wales | — | |
| 2009 | Ross McCormack | Forward | Scotland | 3 | |
| 2010 | No Presentations took place | | | | |
| 2011 | Tom Heaton | Goalkeeper | England | — | |
| 2012 | Joe Mason | Forward | Ireland | — | Won the award in his first season with Cardiff |
| 2014 | Declan John | Defender | Wales | 2 | |
| 2015 | Joe Ralls | Midfielder | England | — | |
| 2016 | Joe Ralls | Midfielder | England | — | **Second Award** |
| 2017 | Kenneth Zohore | Forward | Denmark | — | |
| 2018 | Callum Paterson | Defender | Scotland | 7 | |
| 2019 | Callum Paterson | Defender | Scotland | 11 | **Second Award** |
| 2020 | No Presentations took place | | | | |
| 2021 | No Presentations took place | | | | |
| 2022 | Cody Drameh | Defender | England | — | Won the award whilst on loan with Cardiff |
| 2023 | Jaden Philogene | Winger | England | — | Won the award whilst on loan with Cardiff |
| 2024 | **Rubin Colwill** | Forward | Wales | 9 | |
| 2025 | **Cian Ashford** | Forward | Wales | — | |
| 2026 | **Dylan Lawlor** | Defender | Wales | 5 | |

== Footnotes ==
- Caps are correct to when the player won the award.
- During the 2009–10 season, no presentations took place, but Peter Whittingham was handed the 2010 Player of the Year the following year.
