= Ryan Wintle =

English footballer

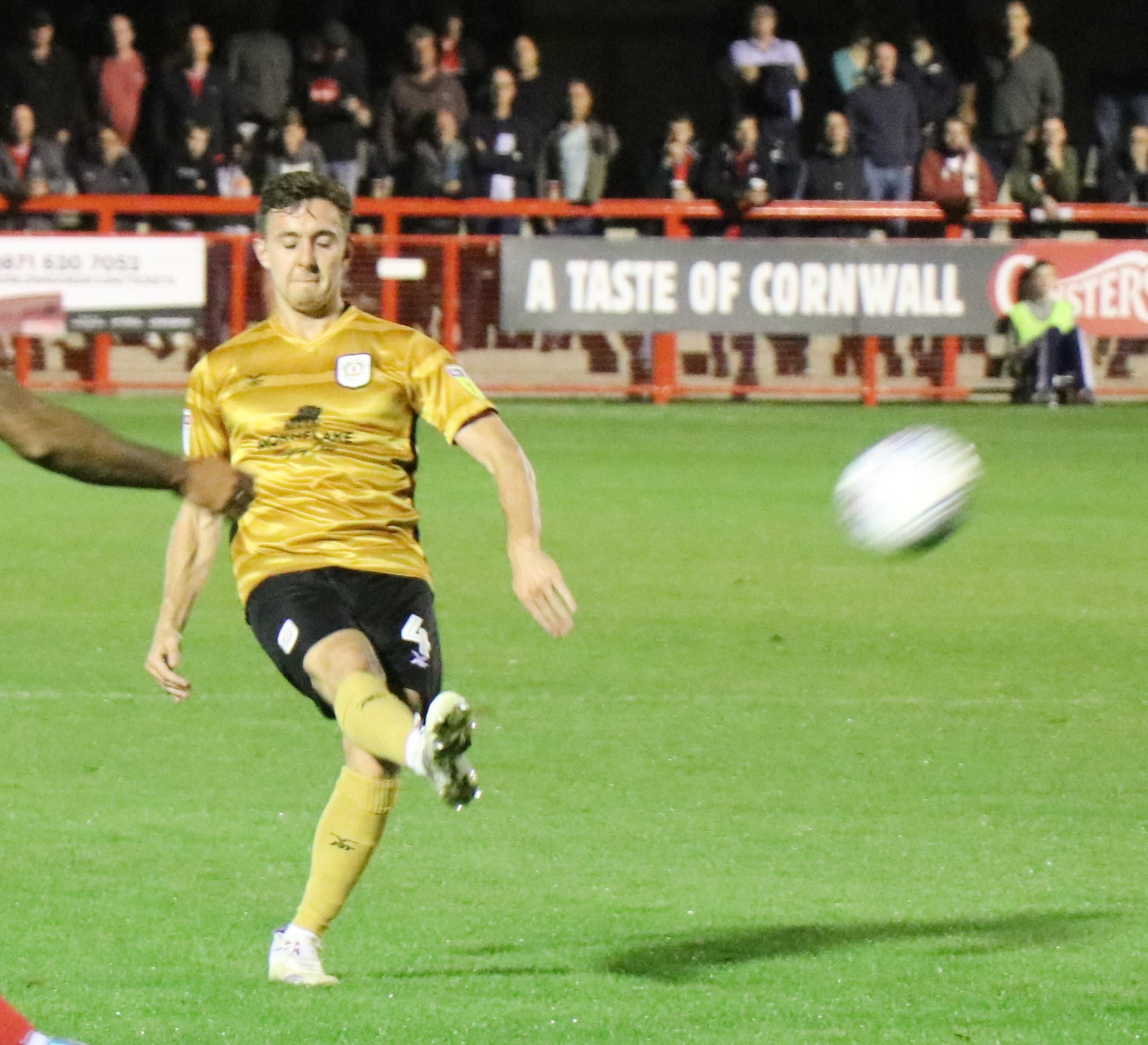
- Wintle in 2019

Personal information
- Full name: Ryan Frank Wintle
- Date of birth: 13 June 1997 (age 29)
- Place of birth: Newcastle-under-Lyme, England
- Height: 1.80 m (5 ft 11 in)
- Position: Defensive midfielder

Team information
- Current team: Milton Keynes Dons
- Number: 24

Youth career
- Stoke City

Senior career*
Years	Team	Apps	(Gls)
2014–2015	Alsager Town	25	(8)
2015–2021	Crewe Alexandra	163	(9)
2021–2026	Cardiff City	150	(5)
2021–2022	→ Blackpool (loan)	18	(0)
2024–2025	→ Millwall (loan)	22	(1)
2026–	Milton Keynes Dons	2	(0)
- * Club domestic league appearances and goals as of 23 August 2026 (UTC)

Ryan Frank Wintle (born 13 June 1997) is an English professional footballer who plays as a defensive midfielder for EFL League One club Milton Keynes Dons.

He has previously played for Alsager Town and Crewe Alexandra; in August 2021, he was loaned by Cardiff to Blackpool for a four-month spell, and he spent the 2024–25 season on loan at Millwall.

== Career ==
=== Crewe Alexandra ===
Wintle began his career with North West Counties Football League side Alsager Town, following time in the academy at Stoke City, and then joined Crewe Alexandra in January 2015, making his professional debut on 14 November 2015, coming on as a second-half substitute in a 2–0 League One defeat at Bradford City. He scored his first league goal on 22 April 2017, at Gresty Road against Leyton Orient.

After playing in the opening 10 games of the 2017–18 season, Wintle was injured in the 11th, a home defeat by Carlisle United on 23 September 2017, sustaining a stress fracture of his tibia that ruled him out "for months". He returned to first team action in January 2018, and scored his second league goal at Swindon Town on 27 January.

After a difficult first half of the 2018–19 season that saw Crewe hover around the relegation zone, manager David Artell switched to a 4-3-3 formation which coincided with an upturn in both the team and Wintle's form. Crewe's post-Christmas run included victories over high-flying Lincoln City, Milton Keynes Dons, Carlisle United, Colchester United and Mansfield Town. This pulled Crewe Alexandra away from the relegation scrap, and gave the club an outside chance of a play-off push. Wintle was considered one of the club's best performers during this run.

With four goals in 46 appearances, Wintle then helped Crewe to promotion in the COVID-19-affected 2019–20 season, and he added two further goals in 48 appearances as Crewe ended the following season in 12th place in League One. On 13 May 2021, Crewe announced that it had offered Wintle a new contract, but as Wintle had previously shunned new contract offers, Artell expected him to move to another club.

=== Cardiff City ===
On 23 June 2021, Wintle signed a three-year contract with Cardiff City. He made his Cardiff debut on 7 August 2021, coming on as a second-half substitute for Joe Ralls in a 1–1 draw against Barnsley. He scored his first Cardiff goal in the club's 3–1 win at Wigan Athletic on 8 October 2022. On 4 August 2023, it was announced that Wintle had signed a new three-year deal to keep him at Cardiff until the summer of 2026.

==== Blackpool (loan) ====
Wintle joined Blackpool on loan on 28 August 2021 for the remainder of the 2021–22 season, making his debut in a 1–0 win over Fulham at Bloomfield Road on 11 September 2021. However, the loan deal had a January 2022 recall option and Wintle returned to Cardiff on 3 January 2022 after playing 18 games for the Seasiders.

==== Millwall (loan) ====
On 28 August 2024, Wintle joined Cardiff's fellow Championship side Millwall on loan until the end of the season, making his club debut three days later coming on as a second-half substitute in the side's 3–0 league defeat of Sheffield Wednesday at The Den. He scored one Millwall goal, in a 2–2 draw at Sheffield Wednesday on 4 January 2025.

==== Return to Cardiff City ====
Wintle returned to Cardiff City following the club's 2025 relegation to League One. He joined a squad with many players considerably younger than him (aged 28); he started the side's first home game, against Peterborough United, as the oldest player by five years. He scored the opening goal in Cardiff's 4–0 win over Plymouth Argyle on 30 August 2025, extending the side's unbeaten run at the start of the season to seven games. Wintle was named Cardiff City Player of the Season for the 2025–26 season as the Bluebirds achieved an immediate promotion back to the Championship. Despite this, on 20 May 2026, Cardiff announced the player would be leaving in the summer when his contract expired. Wintle said this was "a decision that was completely out of my control".

=== Milton Keynes Dons ===
On 13 July 2026, Wintle joined League One club Milton Keynes Dons on a free transfer. He made his debut and scored his first goal for the club in a 4–1 EFL Cup first round defeat away to Norwich City on 8 August 2026.

== Career statistics ==
As of 8 August 2026

Club	Season	Division	League		FA Cup		League Cup		Other		Total	
Club	Season	Division	Apps	Goals	Apps	Goals	Apps	Goals	Apps	Goals	Apps	Goals
Crewe Alexandra	2015–16	League One	3	0	0	0	0	0	0	0	3	0
Crewe Alexandra	2016–17	League Two	17	1	1	0	1	0	1 (Note: Appearances in EFL Trophy)	0	19	1
Crewe Alexandra	2017–18	League Two	18	2	0	0	1	0	1	0	20	2
Crewe Alexandra	2018–19	League Two	46	1	0	0	1	1	3	0	50	2
Crewe Alexandra	2019–20	League Two	37	3	4	0	2	1	3	0	46	4
Crewe Alexandra	2020–21	League One	43	2	2	0	1	0	2	0	48	2
Crewe Alexandra	Crewe total		163	9	7	0	6	2	10	0	186	11
Cardiff City	2021–22	Championship	23	0	1	0	2	0	—		26	0
Cardiff City	2022–23	Championship	45	2	2	1	0	0	—		47	2
Cardiff City	2023–24	Championship	42	2	1	0	1	1	—		44	3
Cardiff City	2024–25	Championship	0	0	0	0	0	0	—		0	0
Cardiff City	2025–26	League One	40	1	1	0	4	0	1	0	46	1
Cardiff City	Cardiff total		150	5	5	1	7	1	1	0	163	6
Blackpool (loan)	2021–22	Championship	18	0	0	0	0	0	—		18	0
Millwall (loan)	2024–25	Championship	22	1	1	0	0	0	—		23	1
Milton Keynes Dons	2026–27	League One	0	0	0	0	1	1	0	0	1	1
Career total			353	15	13	1	14	4	11	0	391	19

== Honours ==
Cardiff City

- EFL League One runner-up: 2025–26

Individual

- Crewe Alexandra Player of the Season: 2019–20
- Crewe Alexandra Players' Player of the Season: 2019–20
- Cardiff City Player of the Season: 2025–26
- Cardiff City Players' Player of the Season: 2025–26
