= Kieffer Moore =

Wales international footballer (born 1992)

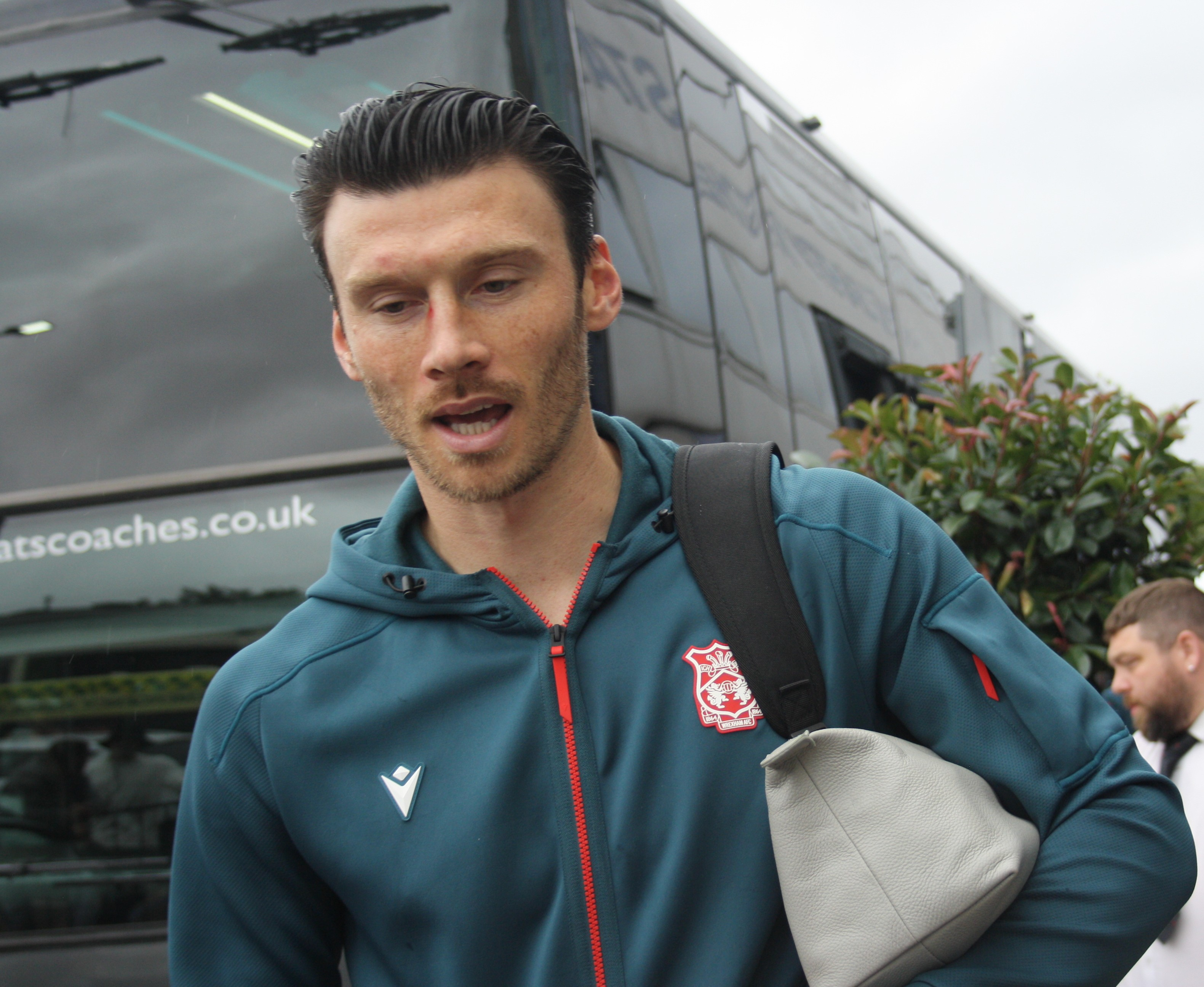
- Moore with Wrexham in 2025

Personal information
- Full name: Kieffer Roberto Francisco Moore
- Date of birth: 8 August 1992 (age 34)
- Place of birth: Torquay, England
- Height: 6 ft 5 in (1.96 m)
- Position: Striker

Team information
- Current team: Wrexham
- Number: 19

Youth career
- Torquay United

Senior career*
| Years | Team | Apps | (Gls) |
| 2012–2013 | Truro City | 22 | (13) |
| 2013 | Dorchester Town | 13 | (7) |
| 2013–2015 | Yeovil Town | 50 | (7) |
| 2015–2016 | Viking | 9 | (0) |
| 2016–2017 | Forest Green Rovers | 33 | (7) |
| 2016 | → Torquay United (loan) | 4 | (5) |
| 2017–2018 | Ipswich Town | 11 | (0) |
| 2017–2018 | → Rotherham United (loan) | 22 | (13) |
| 2018–2019 | Barnsley | 51 | (21) |
| 2019–2020 | Wigan Athletic | 36 | (10) |
| 2020–2022 | Cardiff City | 64 | (25) |
| 2022–2024 | Bournemouth | 39 | (9) |
| 2024 | → Ipswich Town (loan) | 18 | (7) |
| 2024–2025 | Sheffield United | 27 | (5) |
| 2025– | Wrexham | 43 | (13) |

International career^{‡}
| 2016 | England C | 1 | (0) |
| 2019– | Wales | 57 | (15) |
- * Club domestic league appearances and goals as of 02:30, 3 September 2026 (UTC) ‡ National team caps and goals as of 16:05, 4 October 2026 (UTC)

Kieffer Roberto Francisco Moore (born 8 August 1992) is a professional footballer who plays as a striker for EFL Championship club Wrexham and the Wales national team.

Moore started his career with Conference South club Truro City, having as a teen been a part of Torquay United's youth system and playing for South Devon League Division Two club Paignton Saints. Moore joined Dorchester Town in February 2013 due to Truro's continued financial difficulties, and he finished his first season in the Conference South with 20 goals. His goal-scoring record brought him to the attention of Yeovil Town for whom he signed in July 2013.

After making more than fifty appearances for Yeovil, Moore was released and had a brief spell with Norwegian club Viking before returning to English football with Forest Green Rovers. Moore had a loan spell back at his hometown club Torquay United where he scored five goals in four games, grabbing the attention of Championship club Ipswich Town, signing for the club in January 2017. Before the beginning of the 2017–18 season, Moore signed on loan for Rotherham United for whom he scored 13 goals in 20 matches. His form saw him recalled by Ipswich in January 2018, and he subsequently joined fellow Championship club Barnsley for an undisclosed fee.

Born in England, Moore played once for their non-league select team in 2016 but was eligible for Wales, Italy and China through ancestral affiliations, before making his senior debut for Wales in 2019; he was selected subsequently for the Welsh UEFA Euro 2020 finals squad and scored on his first appearance at the tournament. Moore also helped Wales qualify for the FIFA World Cup in 2022 for the first time since 1958.

== Club career ==
=== Non-league ===
Born in Torquay, Devon, Moore began his football career playing in the youth system of Torquay United until the age of 12 when the Devon club were forced to fold their youth programme. Moore subsequently played for Paignton Saints in the South Devon League Division Two for whom he scored 47 goals in 43 matches across two seasons, before in July 2012 he went on trial and subsequently signed for Conference South club Truro City. On 18 August 2012, he made his debut for Truro City in a 2–1 defeat against Billericay Town. Moore scored his first goal for Truro a week later in a 1–1 draw against Conference South leaders Salisbury City, Moore scored for the second time in three days when he headed home a free-kick from player-manager Lee Hodges, in a 2–0 victory over Weston-super-Mare helping Truro to their first victory of the season. The turn of the year saw Moore score seven goals in seven games in January and early February 2013, but after scoring the 80th-minute winner in Truro's 2–1 win over Hayes and Yeading it was announced that Moore was set to join fellow Conference South club Dorchester Town. Moore left Truro City having scored 13 times in 24 appearances for the Cornish club, his manager Hodges described his transfer as "a really big loss" and that it "came out of the blue that he decided to leave".

Moore joined Dorchester Town on 11 February 2013 on an 18-month contract, making his debut the following day in a 3–2 win over Bath City. Moore grabbed his first goal for Dorchester in the following match with a consolation goal in a 2–1 defeat against Basingstoke Town. On 19 February 2013, Moore returned with Dorchester to his former club Truro City and scored a brace in a 2–1 victory for Dorchester to take his goal scoring tally to three goals in his first three matches for Dorchester. Moore's 18th and 19th goals of the season came during Dorchester's 3–2 victory over AFC Hornchurch, two audacious goals first an impudent finish with his right foot and then repeating the feat with his left foot to give his team a late winner. A thigh injury restricted Moore to just 13 appearances for Dorchester but he still managed to take his goal scoring tally to 20 goals for the season finishing as the Conference South's fourth top scorer. Moore's performances for Dorchester were enough for Football League club Charlton Athletic to offer him a trial in May 2013.

He combined his non-league career with Truro and Dorchester with jobs as a lifeguard and personal trainer.

=== Yeovil Town ===
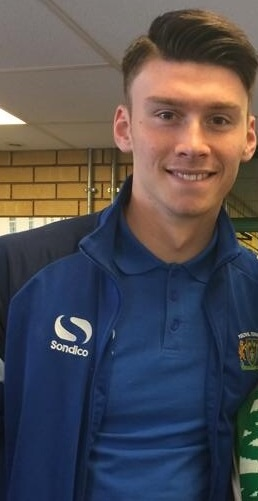
Moore in May 2014.

In late June 2013, Moore joined newly promoted Football League Championship club Yeovil Town on trial for their pre-season. On 6 July 2013, Dorchester Town confirmed they had agreed terms with Yeovil Town for the transfer of Moore for an "undisclosed fee", but that Moore had yet to agree personal terms or have a medical with the club. Moore subsequently signed a two-year contract with Yeovil on 10 July 2013. Moore made his debut for Yeovil as an 82nd-minute substitute in their Football League Cup first round victory over Southend United, on 6 August 2013. On 14 September 2013, Moore made his Football League Championship debut for Yeovil against Sheffield Wednesday as an injury time substitute. Moore scored his first senior goal for Yeovil, on 4 January 2014, in the FA Cup third round in a 4–0 victory against Leyton Orient. Moore's first season in the Championship ended prematurely with a calf injury meaning he missed Yeovil's final three matches as they failed to avoid relegation back to Football League One. Overall, he made 24 appearances for Yeovil in his first season scoring five times making him the club's joint third top goalscorer.

Moore was released by Yeovil at the end of the 2014–15 season following their relegation to League Two.

=== Viking ===
Moore went on trial with Norwegian Tippeligaen club Viking in the summer of 2015, and on 3 August, Viking signed Moore on a one-year contract. He arrived by Bosman ruling as another forward Osita Chikere was released. He made his debut against Sarpsborg on 8 August in a 2–0 victory, coming on for Suleiman Abdullahi. However, he would only make 9 appearances without a goal before leaving.

=== Forest Green Rovers ===
Having been made available for transfer Moore returned to England and spent time on trial with League Two clubs Exeter City, and Leyton Orient. On 18 January 2016, Moore signed for National League club Forest Green Rovers until June 2017. He made his debut for the club on 23 January 2016, playing as a central defender in a 1–0 home win against Braintree Town. His first goal for the club came in a 2–2 away draw at Barrow on 27 February 2016. He helped Forest Green make it into the National League play-offs after finishing second in the division, and appeared as a substitute in the play-off semi-final second leg against Dover Athletic. He was denied the chance to appear in the play-off final defeat to Grimsby Town after rupturing his appendix the night after the semi-final second leg.

==== Torquay United (loan) ====
On 17 November 2016, Moore joined fellow National League club Torquay United on a 28-day loan deal. He scored an 88th-minute equaliser on his debut in a home 1–1 draw against Wrexham. In his second appearance he scored his first career hat-trick in a 3–0 win over Solihull Moors.

=== Ipswich Town ===
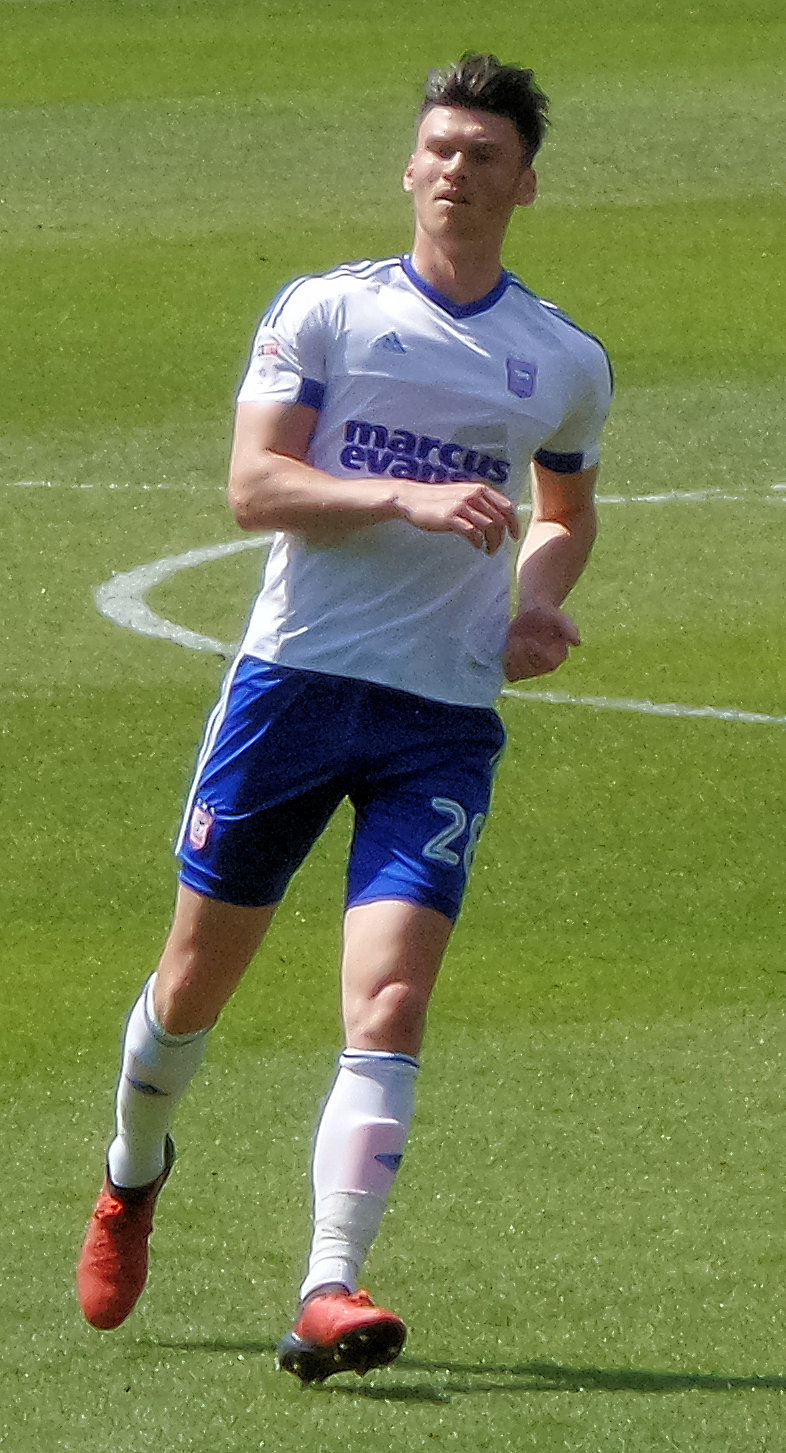
Moore with Ipswich Town in 2017.

On 14 January 2017, Moore signed for Championship club Ipswich Town for £10,000 on an 18-month contract. He made his debut for the club on 21 January 2017, featuring as a second-half substitute in a 0–2 away loss to Huddersfield Town. He made 11 substitute appearances during his first season at Portman Road.

==== Rotherham United (loan) ====
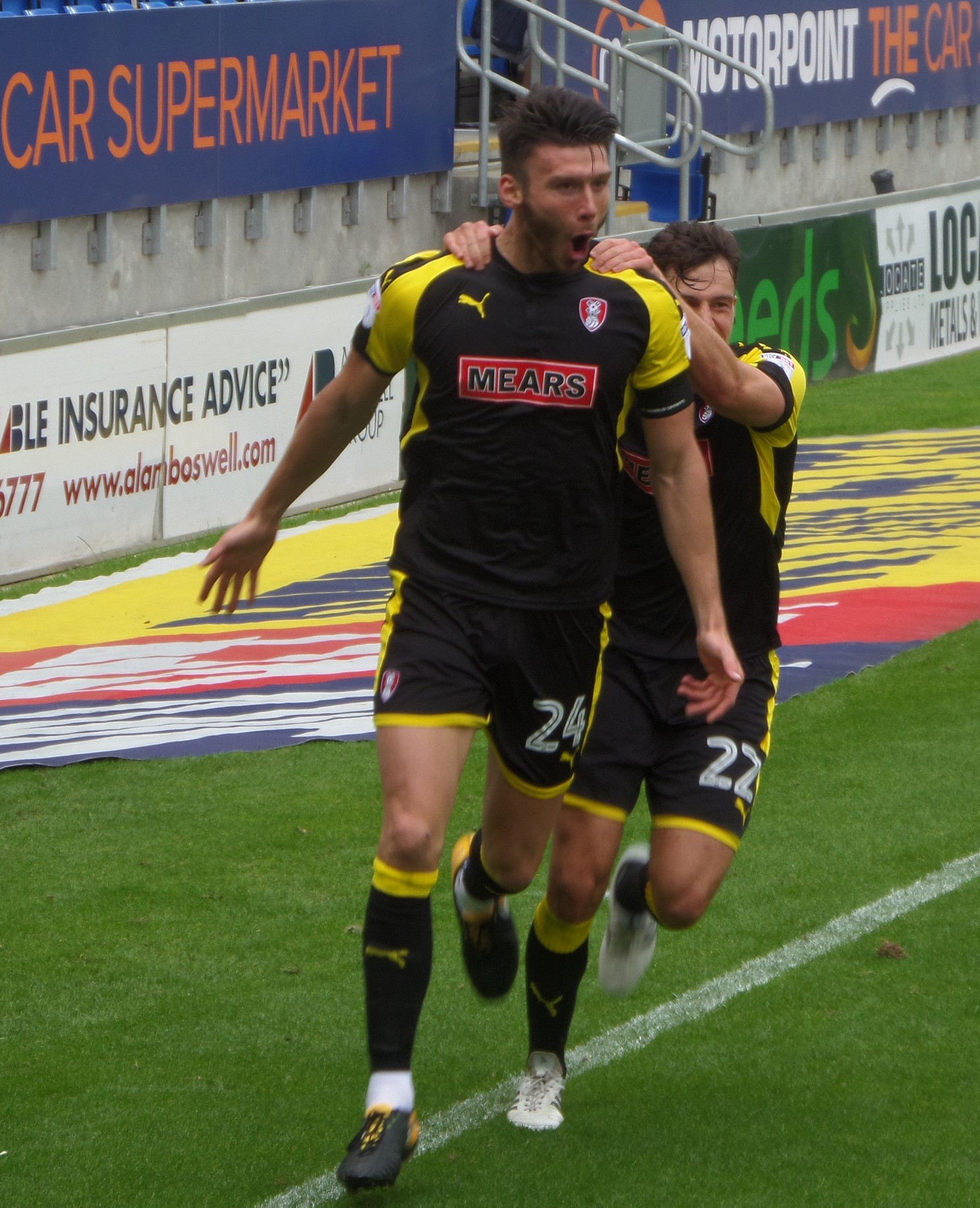
Moore celebrating scoring for Rotherham against Peterborough United in 2017

On 10 July 2017, Moore joined League One club Rotherham United on loan until the end of the season. He scored a hat-trick on his home debut in a 5–0 win against Southend United. On 9 September 2017, Moore then scored a brace against Bury in a 3–2 home win to put him on 6 goals in 6 league appearances. Moore scored his 11th goal of the season away at Oxford on 21 October to put himself back as the league's top scorer. He scored his 12th league goal of the season in a 1–3 loss to Gillingham. Moore's 13th goal of the season was a 96th-minute equaliser against Rotherham rivals Doncaster Rovers.

=== Barnsley ===
On 8 January 2018, Moore signed for Championship club Barnsley for an undisclosed fee on a deal until 2021. Moore scored his first goal for Barnsley in a 2–1 defeat against Burton Albion, on 20 February 2018.

In his second season with Barnsley, Moore emerged as the Tykes' first choice striker, featuring in 31 matches and scoring 17 goals. On 21 August 2018, Moore scored his first hat-trick for Barnsley against Rochdale in a 4–0 away win. On 1 September 2018, Moore scored both goals in Barnsley's 2–1 victory over Gillingham, putting him on six goals in six games for the season. He scored another brace against Sunderland on 27 November 2018 in a 4–2 defeat. On 9 February 2019, Moore was involved in an aerial collision with Gillingham defender Gabriel Zakuani which resulted in Moore being down for 10 minutes and later taken to hospital. On 28 February 2019, it was reported that he would miss the rest of the season with a serious head injury, though he made his return on 19 April 2019 against Shrewsbury Town. On 24 April 2019, Moore was one of five Barnsley players named in the PFA Team of the Year for League One.

=== Wigan Athletic ===
On 5 August 2019, Moore signed for Championship club Wigan Athletic on a three-year deal for an undisclosed fee. He scored his first goal for Wigan, a penalty, on 2 November 2019 in a 2–1 loss to Swansea City. Moore's goal against Reading in February 2020 saw him nominated for Championship goal of the month.

On 14 July 2020, Moore scored twice as Wigan defeated Hull City by a scoreline of 8–0; the result was Wigan's biggest victory in club history. Despite Moore's efforts, Wigan were relegated from the Championship due to a points deduction.

=== Cardiff City ===
Moore signed for Championship club Cardiff City for an undisclosed fee on 13 August 2020. He scored his first goals for the club on 19 September in his second appearance, netting a brace against Nottingham Forest in a 2–0 win. Moore won the February 2021 PFA Player of the Month award after a run of five goals in seven matches.

=== Bournemouth ===
On 31 January 2022, Moore signed for fellow Championship side Bournemouth for an undisclosed fee understood to be worth up to £5m. On 9 February, Moore was substituted on for his debut in the final minutes of the 3–1 win against Birmingham City and suffered a broken foot. He missed two months of action, and made his second appearance against Swansea City on 26 April 2022. With the Cherries losing 3–0 upon his substitution, Moore scored twice to earn a draw. A week later, he scored the match-winning goal against Nottingham Forest, which secured Bournemouth's promotion to the Premier League. He netted a further goal in the final day win over Millwall to make it four goals in just 83 minutes of action for Bournemouth that season.

On 6 August 2022, Moore made his Premier League debut in a 2–0 win against Aston Villa, scoring his first Premier League goal in the 80th minute. On 29 October, he scored twice against Tottenham Hotspur, putting the team into a 2–0 lead, before Tottenham mounted a second half comeback to win 3–2.

==== Return to Ipswich Town (loan) ====
On 1 February 2024, Moore rejoined EFL Championship side Ipswich Town on loan until the end of the 2023–24 season. Moore made 18 appearances for Ipswich and scored seven goals, helping the club achieve promotion to the Premier League.

=== Sheffield United ===
On 15 July 2024, Moore joined Championship club Sheffield United on a three-year deal for an undisclosed fee.

=== Wrexham ===
On 5 August 2025, Moore joined Championship club Wrexham on a three-year deal for an undisclosed fee. On 31 October 2025, Moore scored a perfect hat-trick against league-leading Coventry City, scoring with his right foot, left foot, and head in a 3–2 victory.

== International career ==
Moore was born in England and represented England C on a single occasion in 2016, however later chose to commit to Wales at senior international level.

Moore is eligible for the Wales national team through his paternal grandfather, who hailed from Llanrug. He is also of Italian and Chinese descent, which made him also eligible to represent Italy and China.

He got his debut call-up to a Welsh national team training squad in May 2019. On 10 October 2019, Moore scored his first international goal for the Wales national team in a UEFA Euro 2020 qualifying match against Slovakia. Moore scored in each of his first three away internationals, with further goals in a 2–0 win over Azerbaijan on 16 November 2019 and the winner in a 1–0 win over Finland on 3 September 2020. Moore scored again against Finland on 18 November 2018, this time in a 3–1 victory in Cardiff in another Euro qualifier.

In May 2021, Moore was named in Wales' squad for the Euro 2020 tournament. On 12 June 2021, Moore made his appearance in the first group game against Switzerland, thus locked him to represent Wales internationally. He also scored the equaliser in Wales' opening Euro 2020 group match against the same opponent, earning Wales a 1–1 draw. In November 2022 he was named in the Wales squad for the 2022 FIFA World Cup in Qatar.

== Personal life ==
In September 2025 he graduated in the inaugural cohort of students from the PFA Business School, with an award from the University of Portsmouth.

== Career statistics ==
=== Club ===
As of match played 13 October 2026

Appearances and goals by club, season and competition
| Club | Season | League | | | National cup (Note: Includes FA Cup, Norwegian Cup) | | League cup (Note: Includes EFL Cup) | | Other | | Total | |
| Club | Season | Division | Apps | Goals | Apps | Goals | Apps | Goals | Apps | Goals | Apps | Goals |
|---|---|---|---|---|---|---|---|---|---|---|---|---|
| Truro City | 2012–13 | Conference South | 22 | 13 | 1 | 0 | — | | 1 (Note: Appearance in FA Trophy) | 0 | 24 | 13 |
| Dorchester Town | 2012–13 | Conference South | 13 | 7 | 0 | 0 | — | | 0 | 0 | 13 | 7 |
| Yeovil Town | 2013–14 | Championship | 20 | 4 | 2 | 1 | 2 | 0 | — | | 24 | 5 |
| Yeovil Town | 2014–15 | League One | 30 | 3 | 2 | 1 | 1 | 0 | 1 (Note: Appearance in Football League Trophy) | 0 | 34 | 4 |
| Yeovil Town | Total | | 50 | 7 | 4 | 2 | 3 | 0 | 1 | 0 | 58 | 9 |
| Viking | 2015 | Tippeligaen | 9 | 0 | 2 | 0 | — | | — | | 11 | 0 |
| Forest Green Rovers | 2015–16 | National League | 16 | 2 | 0 | 0 | — | | 1 (Note: Appearance in National League play-offs) | 0 | 17 | 2 |
| Forest Green Rovers | 2016–17 | National League | 17 | 5 | 1 | 0 | — | | 0 | 0 | 18 | 5 |
| Forest Green Rovers | Total | | 33 | 7 | 1 | 0 | — | | 1 | 0 | 35 | 7 |
| Torquay United (loan) | 2016–17 | National League | 4 | 5 | 0 | 0 | — | | — | | 4 | 5 |
| Ipswich Town | 2016–17 | Championship | 11 | 0 | 0 | 0 | 0 | 0 | — | | 11 | 0 |
| Ipswich Town | 2017–18 | Championship | 0 | 0 | 0 | 0 | 0 | 0 | — | | 0 | 0 |
| Ipswich Town | Total | | 11 | 0 | 0 | 0 | 0 | 0 | 0 | 0 | 11 | 0 |
| Rotherham United (loan) | 2017–18 | League One | 22 | 13 | 1 | 0 | 2 | 0 | 0 | 0 | 25 | 13 |
| Barnsley | 2017–18 | Championship | 20 | 4 | — | | — | | — | | 20 | 4 |
| Barnsley | 2018–19 | League One | 31 | 17 | 3 | 2 | 0 | 0 | 1 (Note: Appearance in EFL Trophy) | 0 | 35 | 19 |
| Barnsley | Total | | 51 | 21 | 3 | 2 | 0 | 0 | 1 | 0 | 55 | 23 |
| Wigan Athletic | 2019–20 | Championship | 36 | 10 | 0 | 0 | 0 | 0 | — | | 36 | 10 |
| Cardiff City | 2020–21 | Championship | 42 | 20 | 0 | 0 | 0 | 0 | — | | 42 | 20 |
| Cardiff City | 2021–22 | Championship | 22 | 5 | 0 | 0 | 2 | 0 | — | | 24 | 5 |
| Cardiff City | Total | | 64 | 25 | 0 | 0 | 2 | 0 | 0 | 0 | 66 | 25 |
| Bournemouth | 2021–22 | Championship | 4 | 4 | 0 | 0 | — | | — | | 4 | 4 |
| Bournemouth | 2022–23 | Premier League | 27 | 4 | 1 | 0 | 1 | 0 | — | | 29 | 4 |
| Bournemouth | 2023–24 | Premier League | 8 | 1 | 2 | 1 | 3 | 0 | — | | 13 | 2 |
| Bournemouth | Total | | 39 | 9 | 3 | 1 | 4 | 0 | — | | 46 | 10 |
| Ipswich Town (loan) | 2023–24 | Championship | 18 | 7 | — | | — | | — | | 18 | 7 |
| Sheffield United | 2024–25 | Championship | 27 | 5 | 0 | 0 | 0 | 0 | 3 (Note: Appearances in Championship play-offs) | 1 | 30 | 6 |
| Wrexham | 2025–26 | Championship | 39 | 11 | 2 | 0 | 2 | 2 | — | | 43 | 13 |
| Wrexham | 2026–27 | Championship | 10 | 4 | 0 | 0 | 1 | 0 | 0 | 0 | 11 | 4 |
| Wrexham | Total | | 49 | 15 | 2 | 0 | 3 | 2 | 0 | 0 | 54 | 17 |
| Career total | | | 448 | 144 | 17 | 5 | 14 | 2 | 7 | 1 | 486 | 152 |

=== International ===
As of match played 4 October 2026

Appearances and goals by national team and year
| National team | Year | Apps | Goals |
|---|---|---|---|
| Wales | 2019 | 5 | 2 |
| Wales | 2020 | 7 | 2 |
| Wales | 2021 | 12 | 4 |
| Wales | 2022 | 7 | 1 |
| Wales | 2023 | 8 | 3 |
| Wales | 2024 | 8 | 1 |
| Wales | 2025 | 5 | 2 |
| Wales | 2026 | 5 | 0 |
| Total | | 57 | 15 |

As of match played 4 September 2025. Wales' score listed first, score column indicates score after each Moore goal.

List of international goals scored by Kieffer Moore
| No. | Date | Venue | Cap | Opponent | Score | Result | Competition |
|---|---|---|---|---|---|---|---|
| 1 | 10 October 2019 | Anton Malatinský Stadium, Trnava, Slovakia | 2 | Slovakia | 1–0 | 1–1 | UEFA Euro 2020 qualifying |
| 2 | 16 November 2019 | Bakcell Arena, Baku, Azerbaijan | 4 | Azerbaijan | 1–0 | 2–0 | UEFA Euro 2020 qualifying |
| 3 | 3 September 2020 | Helsinki Olympic Stadium, Helsinki, Finland | 6 | Finland | 1–0 | 1–0 | 2020–21 UEFA Nations League B |
| 4 | 18 November 2020 | Cardiff City Stadium, Cardiff, Wales | 12 | Finland | 3–1 | 3–1 | 2020–21 UEFA Nations League B |
| 5 | 27 March 2021 | Cardiff City Stadium, Cardiff, Wales | 14 | Mexico | 1–0 | 1–0 | Friendly |
| 6 | 12 June 2021 | Baku Olympic Stadium, Baku, Azerbaijan | 18 | Switzerland | 1–1 | 1–1 | UEFA Euro 2020 |
| 7 | 11 October 2021 | Lilleküla Stadium, Tallinn, Estonia | 23 | Estonia | 1–0 | 1–0 | 2022 FIFA World Cup qualification |
| 8 | 16 November 2021 | Cardiff City Stadium, Cardiff, Wales | 24 | Belgium | 1–1 | 1–1 | 2022 FIFA World Cup qualification |
| 9 | 22 September 2022 | King Baudouin Stadium, Brussels, Belgium | 27 | Belgium | 1–2 | 1–2 | 2022–23 UEFA Nations League A |
| 10 | 28 March 2023 | Cardiff City Stadium, Cardiff, Wales | 33 | Latvia | 1–0 | 1–0 | UEFA Euro 2024 qualifying |
| 11 | 11 October 2023 | Racecourse Ground, Wrexham, Wales | 36 | Gibraltar | 2–0 | 4–0 | Friendly |
| 12 | 11 October 2023 | Racecourse Ground, Wrexham, Wales | 36 | Gibraltar | 4–0 | 4–0 | Friendly |
| 13 | 9 September 2024 | Gradski Stadion, Nikšić, Montenegro | 45 | Montenegro | 1–0 | 2–1 | 2024–25 UEFA Nations League B |
| 14 | 6 June 2025 | Cardiff City Stadium, Cardiff, Wales | 49 | Liechtenstein | 3–0 | 3–0 | 2026 FIFA World Cup qualification |
| 15 | 4 September 2025 | Astana Arena, Astana, Kazakhstan | 50 | Kazakhstan | 1–0 | 1–0 | 2026 FIFA World Cup qualification |

== Honours ==
AFC Bournemouth

- EFL Championship runner-up: 2021–22

Ipswich Town

- EFL Championship runner-up: 2023–24

Individual

- PFA Team of the Year: 2018–19 League One
- PFA Fans' Championship Player of the Month: February 2021
- Cardiff City Player of the Year: 2020–21
