= Mark McGuinness =

Irish footballer (born 2001)

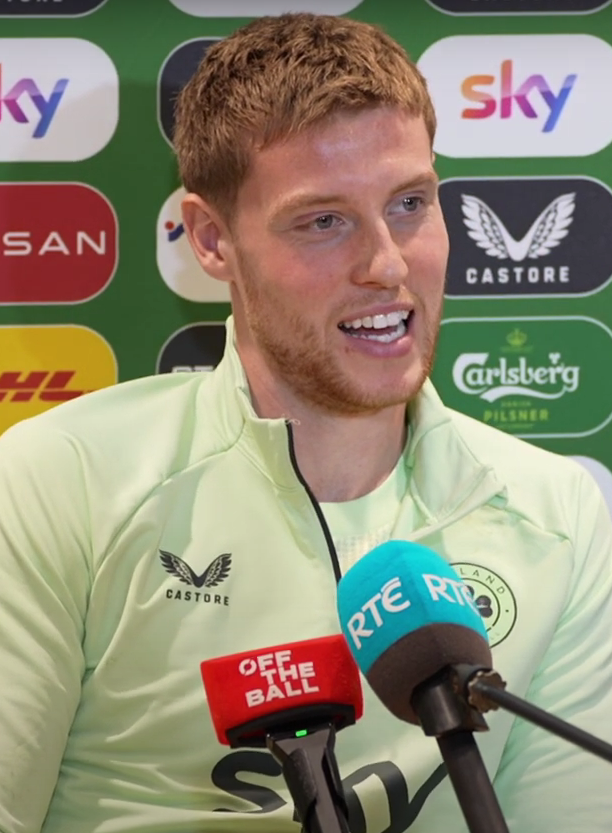
- McGuinness with the Republic of Ireland in 2024

Personal information
- Full name: Mark James McGuinness
- Date of birth: 5 January 2001 (age 25)
- Place of birth: Slough, England
- Height: 1.94 m (6 ft 4 in)
- Position: Centre back

Team information
- Current team: Sheffield United
- Number: 25

Youth career
- 2011–2020: Arsenal

Senior career*
Years	Team	Apps	(Gls)
2020–2021	Arsenal	0	(0)
2020–2021	→ Ipswich Town (loan)	24	(1)
2021–2024	Cardiff City	83	(5)
2022–2023	→ Sheffield Wednesday (loan)	17	(1)
2024–2025	Luton Town	48	(3)
2025–	Sheffield United	36	(1)

International career^{‡}
2019	Republic of Ireland U19	10	(2)
2020–2022	Republic of Ireland U21	13	(1)
2024–	Republic of Ireland	2	(0)
- * Club domestic league appearances and goals as of 13:35, 8 November 2026 (UTC) ‡ National team caps and goals as of 19:30, 16 May 2026 (UTC)

Mark James McGuinness (born 5 January 2001) is a professional footballer who plays as a centre back for EFL Championship club Sheffield United. Born in England, McGuiness represents the Republic of Ireland national team.

== Club career ==
Born in Slough, McGuinness joined Arsenal at the age of 10. After featuring regularly for Arsenal's under-18s side during the 2018–19 season, he signed his first professional contract with the club in April 2019. He broke into Arsenal's under-23 squad during the 2019–20 season, although he missed much of the season through injury. He featured for the Arsenal first-team for the first time during pre-season for the 2020–21 season, including scoring a header in a 4–1 win over Milton Keynes Dons in a friendly on 25 August.

McGuinness signed on a season long loan for Ipswich Town in September 2020. He made his senior debut on 27 October 2020, keeping a clean sheet in a 1–0 win over Gillingham. He scored his first senior career goal in a 1–0 away win over Burton Albion on 16 January 2021. McGuinness made 25 appearances during his loan spell at Ipswich, scoring once.

He signed for Cardiff City on 21 June 2021, on a three-year contract. He scored his first goal for Cardiff in a 2–1 win against Preston North End on 20 November 2021.

On 18 August 2022, McGuinness joined Sheffield Wednesday on a season-long loan. Two days later he made his debut, starting against Bolton Wanderers. He would win the clubs player of the month for November, making five appearances and scoring his first goal for the club against Shrewsbury Town. Another three clean sheets from a possible five in December saw him get back-to-back player of the month awards at the club. He was recalled to Cardiff City on 19 January 2023 having played 23 times.

On 17 August 2023, it was announced that McGuinness had signed a new four-year deal that would keep him at Cardiff until the summer of 2027.

In August 2024, he transferred to Luton Town for a "significant" sum.

On 1 September 2025 he signed for Sheffield United.

== International career ==
McGuinness is a Republic of Ireland youth international, qualifying through his Derry-born father (who grew up in Limavady) and playing for them at under-19 level. He made his debut for the Republic of Ireland under-19 side in March 2019 in a 5–0 win over Romania U19.

He received his first call-up to the Republic of Ireland under-21 team in November 2020, for UEFA Under-21 European Championship Qualifiers at home to Iceland and away to Luxembourg. He made his debut for the under-21s in a 2–1 win over Luxembourg on 18 November. McGuinness scored his first goal for the U21s on 12 October 2021 in a 2–1 loss to Montenegro in Podgorica.

On 3 October 2024, McGuinness received his first call up to the senior Republic of Ireland squad for their upcoming UEFA Nations League fixtures away to Finland and Greece.

McGuinness made his Ireland debut on 17 November 2024, starting in their loss to England.

== Personal life ==
Mark's father, John McGuinness and brother Tom have represented England in bowls.

== Career statistics ==
As of match played 7 November 2026

Appearances and goals by club, season and competition
Club	Season	League			FA Cup		EFL Cup		Other		Total	
Club	Season	Division	Apps	Goals	Apps	Goals	Apps	Goals	Apps	Goals	Apps	Goals
Arsenal U21	2019–20	—			—		—		1 (Note: Appearance in EFL Trophy.)	0	1	0
Arsenal U21	2020–21	—			—		—		1	0	1	0
Arsenal U21	Total		0	0	0	0	0	0	2	0	2	0
Arsenal	2020–21	Premier League	0	0	0	0	0	0	0	0	0	0
Ipswich Town (loan)	2020–21	League One	24	1	1	0	0	0	0	0	25	1
Cardiff City	2021–22	Championship	34	3	1	0	0	0	0	0	35	3
Cardiff City	2022–23	Championship	19	0	0	0	0	0	0	0	19	0
Cardiff City	2023–24	Championship	30	2	0	0	1	0	0	0	31	2
Cardiff City	2024–25	Championship	0	0	0	0	1	0	0	0	1	0
Cardiff City	Total		83	5	1	0	2	0	0	0	86	5
Sheffield Wednesday (loan)	2022–23	League One	17	1	3	0	2	0	2	0	24	1
Luton Town	2024–25	Championship	42	3	1	0	0	0	0	0	43	3
Luton Town	2025–26	League One	6	0	0	0	1	0	0	0	7	0
Luton Town	Total		48	3	1	0	1	0	0	0	50	3
Sheffield United	2025–26	Championship	25	1	1	0	0	0	0	0	26	1
Sheffield United	2026–27	Championship	11	0	0	0	3	1	—		14	1
Sheffield United	Total		36	1	1	0	3	1	0	0	40	2
Career total			208	11	7	0	7	1	4	0	226	12

=== International ===
As of match played 16 May 2026

Appearances and goals by national team and year
National team	Year	Apps	Goals
Republic of Ireland
Republic of Ireland	2024	1	0
Republic of Ireland	2025	0	0
Republic of Ireland	2026	1	0
Total		2	0
