= Cody Drameh =

English footballer (born 2001)

Personal information
- Full name: Cody Callum Pierre Drameh
- Date of birth: 8 December 2001 (age 24)
- Place of birth: Dulwich, London, England
- Height: 5 ft 9 in (1.75 m)
- Position: Full-back

Team information
- Current team: Genoa
- Number: 16

Youth career
- Fulham
- 2020–2021: Leeds United

Senior career*
Years	Team	Apps	(Gls)
2021–2024	Leeds United	5	(0)
2022	→ Cardiff City (loan)	22	(0)
2023	→ Luton Town (loan)	16	(0)
2023–2024	→ Birmingham City (loan)	28	(0)
2024–2026	Hull City	52	(1)
2026–	Genoa	0	(0)

International career
2019	England U18	3	(0)
2020–2021	England U20	3	(0)
2021	England U21	1	(0)
- * Club domestic league appearances and goals as of 18:43, 30 August 2026 (UTC)

Cody Callum Pierre Drameh (born 8 December 2001) is an English professional footballer who plays as a full-back for Serie A club Genoa.

Drameh began his senior career with Leeds United, from where he spent time on loan at Cardiff City, Luton Town and Birmingham City, before joining Hull City in 2024. He represented England at under-18, under-20 and under-21 levels.

== Club career ==
Drameh was born in Dulwich. After playing youth football for Fulham, Drameh signed for Leeds United in August 2020. On 26 October 2021, Drameh made his professional debut for Leeds United, starting in a 2–0 defeat at Arsenal in the EFL Cup fourth round. Five days later he made his Premier League debut for Leeds in the 2–1 win against Norwich City as a second-half substitute for Jamie Shackleton.

On 12 January 2022, Drameh joined Championship side Cardiff City on loan for the remainder of the 2021–22 season. He made his debut for Cardiff on 15 January 2022 in the starting line-up for the 1–0 league loss to Blackburn Rovers. He was named as the Welsh side's Young Player of the Season and Player of the Season for 2021–22.

On 29 January 2023 he joined Luton Town on loan for the remainder of the 2022–23 season. He won promotion to the Premier League with the club, and in summer 2023 was linked with a transfer back to Luton or to fellow promoted team Burnley.

Drameh joined Championship club Birmingham City on 1 September 2023 on a season-long loan. After two defeats in new manager Wayne Rooney's first two games in charge, Drameh said the team had to be patient.

Drameh was offered a new contract by Leeds at the end of the 2023–24 season. He left the club following the expiry of his contract on 30 June 2024.

Drameh joined Championship club Hull City on 23 July 2024; he signed a three-year contract with an option for a fourth year. On 24 August 2024, he made his debut for the club when he came on as a 71st-minute substitute for Ryan Giles, in the 0–0 home draw against Millwall. On 1 October 2024, he scored his first goal for Hull City in a 1–3 away win against Queens Park Rangers.

On 1 September 2026, Drameh joined Serie A side Genoa.

== International career ==
He has represented England at under-18 and under-20 level. Drameh also qualifies for Gambia through his parents. In October 2020 Drameh was called up to the Gambia senior squad.

On 16 November 2021, Drameh made his England under-21 debut during a 3–2 defeat to Georgia in Batumi.

== Career statistics ==
As of match played 29 August 2026

Appearances and goals by club, season and competition
Club	Season	League			National cup (Note: Includes FA Cup, Coppa Italia)		League cup (Note: Includes EFL Cup)		Other		Total	
Club	Season	Division	Apps	Goals	Apps	Goals	Apps	Goals	Apps	Goals	Apps	Goals
Leeds United U21	2021–22	—			—		—		1 (Note: Appearance(s) in EFL Trophy)	0	1	0
Leeds United U21	2022–23	—			—		—		3	1	3	1
Leeds United U21	Total		—		—		—		4	1	4	1
Leeds United	2021–22	Premier League	3	0	1	0	1	0	—		5	0
Leeds United	2022–23	Premier League	1	0	1	0	1	0	—		3	0
Leeds United	2023–24	Championship	1	0	0	0	1	0	—		2	0
Leeds United	Total		5	0	2	0	3	0	0	0	10	0
Cardiff City (loan)	2021–22	Championship	22	0	0	0	0	0	—		22	0
Luton Town (loan)	2022–23	Championship	16	0	0	0	0	0	3 (Note: Appearance(s) in Championship play-offs)	0	19	0
Birmingham City (loan)	2023–24	Championship	28	0	2	0	0	0	—		30	0
Hull City	2024–25	Championship	28	1	1	0	0	0	—		29	1
Hull City	2025–26	Championship	22	0	2	0	1	0	1	0	26	0
Hull City	2026–27	Premier League	2	0	—		1	0	—		3	0
Hull City	Total		52	1	3	0	2	0	1	0	58	1
Genoa	2026–27	Serie A	0	0	1	0	—		—		1	0
Career total			123	1	8	0	5	0	8	1	144	2

== Honours ==
Luton Town

- EFL Championship play-offs: 2023

Hull City

- EFL Championship play-offs: 2026

Individual

- Cardiff City Player of the Season & Young Player of the Season: 2021–22
