= Aden Flint =

English footballer (born 1989)

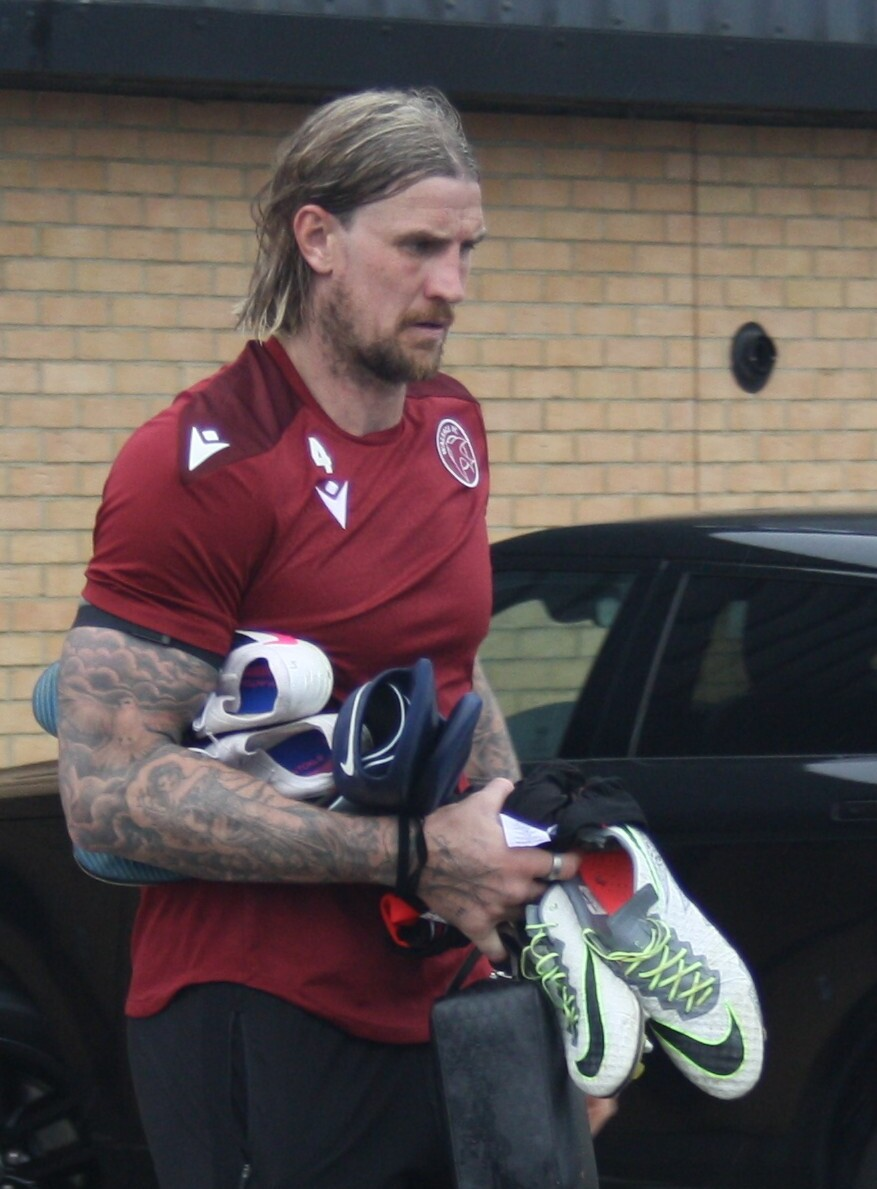
- Flint in 2026

Personal information
- Full name: Aden Flint
- Date of birth: 11 July 1989 (age 37)
- Place of birth: Pinxton, England
- Height: 1.97 m (6 ft 6 in)
- Position: Centre-back

Team information
- Current team: Rochdale
- Number: 44

Senior career*
Years	Team	Apps	(Gls)
2007–2008	Pinxton		
2008–2011	Alfreton Town	67	(3)
2008–2009	→ Matlock Town (loan)		
2011–2013	Swindon Town	64	(4)
2011	→ Alfreton Town (loan)	13	(1)
2013–2018	Bristol City	209	(36)
2018–2019	Middlesbrough	39	(1)
2019–2022	Cardiff City	86	(10)
2020–2021	→ Sheffield Wednesday (loan)	4	(0)
2022–2023	Stoke City	9	(0)
2023	→ Sheffield Wednesday (loan)	18	(1)
2023–2025	Mansfield Town	82	(3)
2025–2026	Walsall	44	(1)
2026–	Rochdale	1	(1)

International career
2010	England C	2	(0)
- * Club domestic league appearances and goals as of 7 May 2025 (UTC)

Aden Flint (born 11 July 1989) is an English professional footballer who plays for EFL League Two club Rochdale.

== Club career ==
=== Early career ===
Flint began his career in the Central Midlands Football League with Pinxton before stepping up to the Conference North in the summer of 2008 when he joined Alfreton Town. At Alfreton, Flint worked part-time tarmacking roads.

Flint spent three months of his debut season at Alfreton on loan with Northern Premier League Premier Division side Matlock Town. The adverse weather prevented Flint from playing many games but he scored in the 5–0 victory over Leigh Genesis in January 2009. The following month saw Flint play in the 1–1 draw against Ilkeston Town, and scored an own goal in the 2–0 loss at Whitby Town. On 26 February 2009, Matlock manager Mark Atkins confirmed that Flint was among three players to have departed the club following the end of his loan.

Flint spent the rest of his Alfreton career within its first team set-up helping reach the Conference North play-off final during the 2009–10 season where they lost 2–1 to Fleetwood Town. He impressed many visiting scouts with bids being turned down from Derby County, Luton Town and ten other clubs according to Alfreton chairman, Wayne Bradley.

=== Swindon Town ===
In January 2011, Colchester United manager John Ward confirmed that his club had been in talks with Flint over a move to the Essex club. Ward also announced that Flint was scheduled to travel to Wiltshire the next day to discuss a possible move with Swindon Town with Danny Wilson.

Days later Swindon Town announced the signing of Flint on a 2 1/2-year contract and was issued the number 16 shirt which had been recently made available after the departure of on-loan Manchester City forward David Ball.

Flint made his Swindon debut in the 1–1 draw with Rochdale and featured in the following fixture against Leyton Orient which resulted in a 3–0 loss for the Wiltshire club.

In March 2011, Flint returned to Alfreton Town on a loan until the end of the 2010–11 season. New Swindon manager Paul Hart was impressed with Flint's attitude in training but had decided to select more experienced players such as Andy Frampton instead. Upon rejoining Alfreton, Flint was immediately handed the captaincy and led the club to promotion from the Conference North.

On 6 August 2011, Flint scored his first goal against Crewe Alexandra. He was a consistent performer in Town's 2011–12 title winning season. Flint scored twice in a 3–0 win against Stevenage at the County Ground on 20 April. The victory secured Swindon's place in the 2012–13 League One play-off.

=== Bristol City ===
Flint signed for Bristol City on 11 June 2013 for a fee of £300,000. Due to a sell on clause his previous club Alfreton Town received 20% of the fee (£60,000). He made his debut on 3 August in a 2–2 draw against Bradford City at Ashton Gate. He scored his first goal for the club on 21 September in a 3–2 defeat to former club Swindon Town. On 8 February, he scored his second goal for the club in a 1–1 draw against Oldham Athletic. He scored again in the following game three days later in a 3–1 win against Leyton Orient.

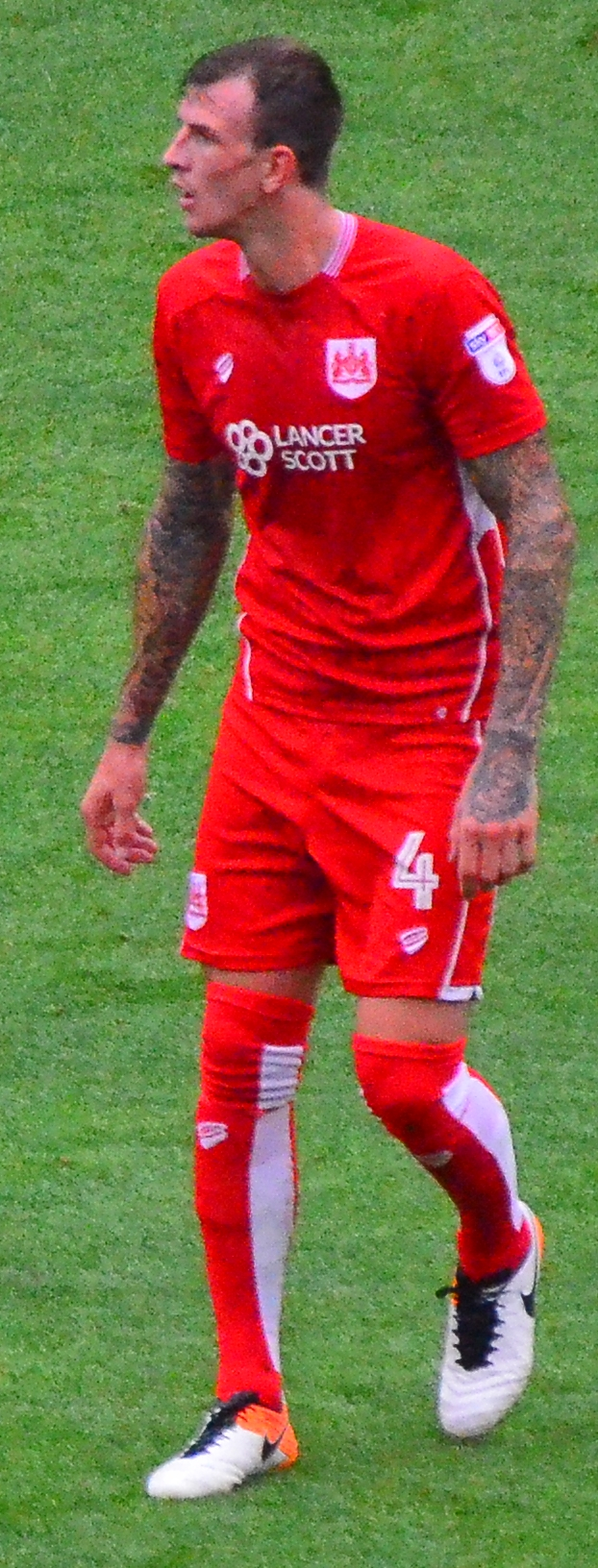
Flint with Bristol City in 2016

Flint briefly sparked a hostile relationship with fans of his former team Swindon by stating in an interview that he did not wish for them to achieve promotion. On 3 May 2015, in the final game of the 2014–15 season (during which City won the league), he scored his first ever hat-trick in an 8–2 victory over Walsall, bringing his total for the season to 15.

Aden Flint was awarded Player of the Year for the 2015–16 season, in which he helped Bristol City narrowly avoid relegation back to League One.

Flint featured in every game as Bristol City reached the semi-finals of the 2017–18 EFL Cup with wins over Premier League opponents Watford, Stoke City, Crystal Palace and Manchester United. Flint scored in the semi-final defeat against Premier League leaders Manchester City.

=== Middlesbrough ===
On 27 June 2018, Flint joined Championship club Middlesbrough for an undisclosed fee believed to be in the region of £7m, signing on a four-year contract.

=== Cardiff City ===
Flint joined Cardiff City on 19 July 2019 on a three-year contract He made his debut on the opening day of the 2019–20 season in a 3–2 defeat to Wigan Athletic. In his second appearance, he scored his first goal for the club, scoring the opening goal in a 2–1 victory over Luton Town.

Flint returned to Cardiff in January 2021 and became a key fixture of the side under new manager Mick McCarthy. He bagged his first goal following his return in a 1–0 victory over arch rivals Swansea City, a goal which earned him cult status among City fans.

Flint began the 2021–22 season in fine form, scoring a late brace in an away match against newly-promoted Peterborough United to salvage a 2–2 draw for the Bluebirds. Flint doubled his tally a week later, grabbing another brace in a 3–1 home victory over Millwall. This briefly placed him atop the Championship's goalscoring charts. Flint announced on social media at the end of the 2021–22 season that he would be leaving the club on a free transfer. On 10 June 2022, Cardiff announced Flint would leave the club when his contract expired on 30 June.

==== Sheffield Wednesday (loan) ====
On 16 October 2020, Flint joined Sheffield Wednesday on a season-long loan. He made his debut the day later, starting away to Birmingham City, helping to keep a clean sheet. During the game away to Rotherham United, Flint would pick up a hamstring injury which would require surgery which would rule him out for a "few weeks minimum" according to manager Garry Monk. He wouldn't play for Sheffield Wednesday again as his loan would be cut short on 4 January 2021.

=== Stoke City ===
On 15 June 2022, Flint joined Stoke City a one-year contract. After playing in nine matches at the start of the season, Flint quickly fell out of favour with Alex Neil and was released by Stoke at the end of the 2022–23 season, his final appearance coming in a 4–0 home loss to Watford.

==== Return to Sheffield Wednesday ====
On 27 January 2023, Flint re-joined Sheffield Wednesday on loan for the rest of the season. He made his second-debut against Fleetwood Town the following day coming off the bench.

=== Mansfield Town ===
On 3 August 2023, Flint signed for League Two club Mansfield Town on an initial one-year deal with the option for a further season. He was a member of the Mansfield squad that earned promotion in third place, and was subsequently named in the PFA Team of the Year for League Two.

On 7 May 2025, the club announced he would be released in June once his contract expired.

=== Walsall ===
On 21 July 2025, Flint signed for League Two club Walsall on a one-year contract.

On 6 May 2026, the club announced the player would be leaving in the summer when his contract expired.

=== Rochdale ===
After his release Flint trained and played in pre season for League One club Notts County including against former club Walsall.

On 11 September 2026, Flint signed for League Two club Rochdale on a short term deal until January.

== International career ==
Flint's form at Alfreton Town during the early 2010–11 campaign earned him his first international call-up when Paul Fairclough named his within his 16-man England C squad for the friendly with Wales national semi-professional football team. He played the first 45 minutes in the 2–2 draw at Latham Park in Newtown, Wales.

Flint was capped for a second and final time in October 2010 when he played the entire 90 minutes of England C's 1–0 away win at the Kadriorg Stadium, Tallinn against an Estonia U-23's in the International Challenge Trophy.

When Flint signed for Swindon Town in January 2011, he became ineligible for selection for the England C squad so was unable to make the final squad for the International Challenge Trophy.

== Career statistics ==
As of match played 7 December 2025

Appearances and goals by club, season and competition
Club	Season	League			FA Cup		League Cup		Other		Total	
Club	Season	Division	Apps	Goals	Apps	Goals	Apps	Goals	Apps	Goals	Apps	Goals
Alfreton Town	2008–09	Conference North	12	0	0	0	—		2 (Note: Appearance(s) in Conference North play-offs)	0	14	0
Alfreton Town	2009–10	Conference North	38	1	3	1	—		6 (Note: Three appearances in Conference North play-offs; two appearances in FA Trophy; one appearance in Derbyshire Senior Cup)	0	47	2
Alfreton Town	2010–11 (Note: Part of this season was spent on loan from Swindon Town)	Conference North	30	3	2	0	—		5 (Note: Four appearances one goal in FA Trophy; one appearance in Derbyshire Senior Cup)	1	37	4
Alfreton Town	Total		80	4	5	1	—		13	1	98	6
Swindon Town	2010–11	League One	3	0	0	0	0	0	0	0	3	0
Swindon Town	2011–12	League Two	32	2	3	1	2	0	3 (Note: Appearance(s) in Football League Trophy)	1	40	4
Swindon Town	2012–13	League One	29	2	1	0	3	1	3 (Note: Two appearances one goal in League Two play-offs; one appearance in Football League Trophy)	1	36	4
Swindon Town	Total		64	4	4	1	5	1	6	2	79	8
Bristol City	2013–14	League One	34	3	4	0	3	0	2	0	43	3
Bristol City	2014–15	League One	46	14	5	0	0	0	6	1	57	15
Bristol City	2015–16	Championship	44	6	2	0	1	0	—		47	6
Bristol City	2016–17	Championship	46	5	3	0	4	0	—		53	5
Bristol City	2017–18	Championship	39	8	1	0	6	1	—		46	9
Bristol City	Total		209	36	15	0	14	1	8	1	246	38
Middlesbrough	2018–19	Championship	39	1	2	0	1	0	—		42	1
Cardiff City	2019–20	Championship	26	3	3	2	1	0	—		30	5
Cardiff City	2020–21	Championship	22	1	0	0	0	0	—		22	1
Cardiff City	2021–22	Championship	38	6	1	0	2	0	—		41	6
Cardiff City	Total		86	10	4	2	3	0	0	0	93	12
Sheffield Wednesday (loan)	2020–21	Championship	4	0	0	0	0	0	—		4	0
Stoke City	2022–23	Championship	9	0	0	0	0	0	—		9	0
Sheffield Wednesday (loan)	2022–23	League One	18	1	1	0	0	0	2 (Note: Appearance(s) in League One play-offs)	0	21	1
Mansfield Town	2023–24	League Two	46	2	1	0	4	0	3	0	54	2
Mansfield Town	2024–25	League One	36	1	1	0	1	0	1	0	39	1
Walsall	2025–26	League Two	44	1	3	1	1	0	0	0	48	2
Career total			609	60	34	4	30	3	33	4	694	71

== Honours ==
Alfreton Town

- Conference North: 2010–11

Swindon Town

- Football League Two: 2011–12

Bristol City

- Football League One: 2014–15
- Football League Trophy: 2014–15

Sheffield Wednesday

- EFL League One play-offs: 2023

Mansfield Town

- EFL League Two third-place promotion: 2023–24

Individual

- Football League One Player of the Month: March 2015
- PFA Team of the Year: 2014–15 League One, 2023–24 League Two
- Bristol City Player of the Year: 2014–15, 2015–16
- Football League/EFL Championship Player of the Month: February 2016, September 2017
- EFL League Two Team of the Season: 2023–24
