= 2021–22 Cardiff City F.C. season =

Welsh football club season

Cardiff City
2021–22 season
- Owner: Vincent Tan
- Chairman: Mehmet Dalman
- Manager: Mick McCarthy (until 23 October); Steve Morison (from 12 November)
- Stadium: Cardiff City Stadium
- Championship: 18th
- FA Cup: Fourth round
- EFL Cup: Second round
- Top goalscorer: League: Aden Flint (6 goals); All: Aden Flint; Rubin Colwill (6 each)
- Highest home attendance: 27,280 (vs. Swansea City, 2 April 2022)
- Lowest home attendance: 3,500 (vs. Sutton United Carabao Cup, 10 Aug)
- Average home league attendance: 18,869
- Biggest win: 4–0 (vs. Peterborough, 9 February)
- Biggest defeat: 1–5 (vs. Blackburn Rovers, 25 Sep); 0–4 (vs. West Bromwich Albion, 28 Sep)
Home colours	Away colours	Third colours

The 2021–22 season is the 123rd season in the existence of Cardiff City Football Club. In addition to the Championship, Cardiff City participated in this season's editions of the FA Cup and the EFL Cup.

== First-team squad ==
As of 30 January 2022

Note: Flags indicate national team as has been defined under FIFA eligibility rules. Players may hold more than one non-FIFA nationality.

No.	Name	Nat.	Position(s)	Date of birth (age)	Apps.	Goals	Year signed	Signed from	Transfer fee	Ends
Goalkeepers
1	Dillon Phillips	(England)	GK	11 June 1995 (aged 27)	36	0	2020	(England) Charlton Athletic	Undisclosed	2023
25	Alex Smithies	(England)	GK	5 March 1990 (aged 32)	100	0	2018	(England) Queens Park Rangers	£4,000,000	2022
31	George Ratcliffe	(Wales)	GK	12 September 2000 (aged 21)	0	0	2021	Academy	Trainee	—
Defenders
2	Mark McGuinness	(Republic of Ireland) (England)	CB	5 January 2001 (aged 21)	35	3	2021	(England) Arsenal	Undisclosed	2024
3	Joel Bagan	(Republic of Ireland) (England) (Scotland)	LB	3 September 2001 (aged 20)	37	3	2020	Academy	Trainee	2023
4	Sean Morrison	(England) (Republic of Ireland)	CB	8 January 1991 (aged 31)	295	33	2014	(England) Reading	£3,180,000	2022
5	Aden Flint	(England)	CB	11 July 1989 (aged 32)	93	12	2019	(England) Middlesbrough	£4,000,000	2022
16	Curtis Nelson	(England)	CB	21 May 1993 (aged 29)	115	3	2019	(England) Oxford United	Free	2023
17	Cody Drameh	(England)	RB/LB	8 December 2001 (aged 20)	22	0	2022	(England) Leeds United	Loan	2022
38	Perry Ng	(England) (Singapore)	RB/LB/CB	27 April 1996 (aged 26)	61	0	2021	(England) Crewe Alexandra	£350,000	2024
40	Tom Davies	(Wales)	LB	1 January 2003 (aged 19)	1	0	2021	Academy	Trainee	2024
Midfielders
6	Will Vaulks	(Wales) (England)	DM	13 September 1993 (aged 28)	117	11	2019	(England) Rotherham United	£2,100,000	2022
7	Leandro Bacuna	(Curaçao) (Netherlands)	CM/RB	21 August 1991 (aged 30)	115	4	2019	(England) Aston Villa	£4,000,000	2023
8	Joe Ralls	(England)	CM/LM	12 October 1993 (aged 28)	308	32	2011	Academy	Trainee	2022
15	Ryan Wintle	(England)	DM/CM/CB	13 June 1997 (aged 25)	26	0	2021	(England) Crewe Alexandra	Free	2024
18	Alfie Doughty	(England)	LM/LB/CM	21 December 1999 (aged 22)	9	1	2022	(England) Stoke City	Loan	2022
21	Marlon Pack	(England)	CM/DM	25 March 1991 (aged 31)	109	5	2019	(England) Bristol City	Undisclosed	2022
22	Tommy Doyle	(England)	CM/DM	17 October 2001 (aged 20)	20	2	2022	(England) Manchester City	Loan	2022
27	Rubin Colwill	(Wales)	AM/CM	27 April 2002 (aged 20)	44	6	2020	Academy	Trainee	2024
37	Sam Bowen	(Wales)	DM/CM	14 January 2001 (aged 21)	5	0	2021	Academy	Trainee	2023
Forwards
9	Jordan Hugill	(England)	CF	4 June 1992 (aged 30)	19	4	2022	(England) Norwich City	Loan	2022
10	Uche Ikpeazu	(Uganda) (England)	CF	28 February 1995 (aged 27)	13	3	2022	(England) Middlesbrough	Loan	2022
14	Isaac Vassell	(England)	CF	9 September 1993 (aged 28)	3	1	2019	(England) Birmingham City	Undisclosed	2022
19	James Collins	(Republic of Ireland) (England)	CF	1 December 1990 (aged 31)	30	3	2021	(England) Luton Town	Free	2023
23	Max Watters	(England)	CF	23 March 1999 (aged 23)	11	1	2021	(England) Crawley Town	Undisclosed	2024
29	Mark Harris	(Wales)	CF/LW/RW	29 December 1998 (aged 23)	56	7	2017	Academy	Trainee	2023
39	Isaak Davies	(Wales)	CF	25 September 2001 (aged 20)	30	3	2020	Academy	Trainee	2025
Out on Loan
11	Josh Murphy	(England)	LW/RW/SS	24 February 1995 (aged 27)	99	14	2018	(England) Norwich City	£11,000,000	2022
20	Gavin Whyte	(Northern Ireland)	RW	31 January 1996 (aged 26)	37	1	2019	(England) Oxford United	£2,000,000	2023
28	Tom Sang	(England)	AM/RW/RB	29 June 1999 (aged 23)	16	0	2020	(England) Manchester United	Free	2023
30	Ciaron Brown	(Northern Ireland) (England)	CB	14 January 1998 (aged 24)	19	0	2018	(England) Wealdstone	Trainee	2022
36	Kieron Evans	(Wales)	AM/LW/RW	19 December 2001 (aged 20)	6	0	2021	Academy	Trainee	2023

== Statistics ==
As of 7 May 2022
Players with names in italics and marked * were on loan from another club for the whole of their season with Cardiff City.

No.	Pos	Nat	Player	Total		Championship		FA Cup		EFL Cup	
No.	Pos	Nat	Player	Apps	Goals	Apps	Goals	Apps	Goals	Apps	Goals
1	GK	(England) ENG	Dillon Phillips	19	0	17+0	0	2+0	0	0+0	0
2	DF	(Republic of Ireland) IRL	Mark McGuinness	35	3	33+1	3	1+0	0	0+0	0
3	DF	(Republic of Ireland) IRL	Joel Bagan	28	3	22+4	3	2+0	0	0+0	0
4	DF	(England) ENG	Sean Morrison	19	3	16+0	3	1+0	0	2+0	0
5	DF	(England) ENG	Aden Flint	42	6	36+3	6	1+0	0	2+0	0
6	MF	(Wales) WAL	Will Vaulks	40	2	23+13	2	2+0	0	2+0	0
7	MF	(Curaçao) CUW	Leandro Bacuna	15	1	13+2	1	0+0	0	0+0	0
8	MF	(England) ENG	Joe Ralls	29	1	26+3	1	0+0	0	0+0	0
9	FW	(England) ENG	Jordan Hugill*	19	4	17+1	4	0+1	0	0+0	0
10	FW	(Uganda) UGA	Uche Ikpeazu*	13	3	1+12	3	0+0	0	0+0	0
15	MF	(England) ENG	Ryan Wintle	25	0	19+3	0	0+1	0	2+0	0
16	DF	(England) ENG	Curtis Nelson	33	0	30+0	0	1+0	0	2+0	0
17	DF	(England) ENG	Cody Drameh*	22	0	22+0	0	0+0	0	0+0	0
18	MF	(England) ENG	Alfie Doughty*	9	1	7+2	1	0+0	0	0+0	0
19	FW	(Republic of Ireland) IRL	James Collins	30	3	13+13	3	2+0	0	1+1	0
21	MF	(England) ENG	Marlon Pack	25	1	22+1	1	2+0	0	0+0	0
22	MF	(England) ENG	Tommy Doyle*	20	2	17+2	2	0+1	0	0+0	0
23	FW	(England) ENG	Max Watters	8	1	5+3	1	0+0	0	0+0	0
25	GK	(England) ENG	Alex Smithies	31	0	29+0	0	0+0	0	2+0	0
27	MF	(Wales) WAL	Rubin Colwill	38	6	15+19	5	1+1	1	0+2	0
29	FW	(Wales) WAL	Mark Harris	37	4	17+17	3	1+1	1	1+0	0
32	MF	(Wales) WAL	Eli King	5	0	3+1	0	1+0	0	0+0	0
34	DF	(England) ENG	Jai Semenyo	1	0	0+0	0	0+1	0	0+0	0
37	MF	(Wales) WAL	Sam Bowen	5	0	3+1	0	0+0	0	1+0	0
38	DF	(England) ENG	Perry Ng	41	0	38+0	0	2+0	0	1+0	0
39	FW	(Wales) WAL	Isaak Davies	30	3	10+18	2	1+1	1	0+0	0
40	DF	(Wales) WAL	Tom Davies	1	0	0+0	0	0+0	0	1+0	0
41	MF	(Ivory Coast) CIV	Tavio Kouakou D'Almeida	1	0	0+0	0	0+0	0	1+0	0
42	DF	(Wales) WAL	Oliver Denham	7	0	5+0	0	1+0	0	0+1	0
Players out on loan:
11	MF	(England) ENG	Josh Murphy	2	1	0+0	0	0+0	0	2+0	1
28	MF	(England) ENG	Tom Sang	5	0	3+0	0	0+1	0	1+0	0
30	DF	(Northern Ireland) NIR	Ciaron Brown	6	0	5+0	0	1+0	0	0+0	0
35	FW	(England) ENG	Chanka Zimba	1	0	1+0	0	0+0	0	0+0	0
36	MF	(Wales) WAL	Kieron Evans	5	0	1+3	0	0+1	0	0+0	0
Players who left the club during the season:
10	FW	(Wales) WAL	Kieffer Moore	23	5	15+7	5	0+0	0	0+1	0
24	FW	(Wales) WAL	Marley Watkins	1	2	0+0	0	0+0	0	1+0	2
26	MF	(England) ENG	Ryan Giles*	21	0	19+2	0	0+0	0	0+0	0

=== Goals record ===
As of 7 May 2022

Rank	No.	Nat.	Po.	Name	Championship	FA Cup	EFL Cup	Total
1	5	(England)	CB	Aden Flint	6	0	0	6
1	27	(Wales)	AM	Rubin Colwill	5	1	0	6
3	~~10~~	(Wales)	CF	Kieffer Moore	5	0	0	5
4	9	(England)	CF	Jordan Hugill	4	0	0	4
4	29	(Wales)	SS	Mark Harris	3	1	0	4
4	2	(Republic of Ireland)	CB	Mark McGuinness	3	0	0	3
4	3	(Republic of Ireland)	LB	Joel Bagan	3	0	0	3
4	4	(England)	CB	Sean Morrison	3	0	0	3
4	10	(Uganda)	CF	Uche Ikpeazu	3	0	0	3
4	19	(Republic of Ireland)	CF	James Collins	3	0	0	3
4	39	(Wales)	CF	Isaak Davies	2	1	0	3
12	6	(England)	DM	Will Vaulks	2	0	0	2
12	22	(England)	CM	Tommy Doyle	2	0	0	2
12	~~24~~	(Wales)	RW	Marley Watkins	0	0	2	2
15	7	(Curaçao)	CM	Leandro Bacuna	1	0	0	1
15	8	(England)	CM	Joe Ralls	1	0	0	1
15	11	(England)	LW	Josh Murphy	0	0	1	1
15	18	(England)	LM	Alfie Doughty	1	0	0	1
15	21	(England)	CM	Marlon Pack	1	0	0	1
15	23	(England)	CF	Max Watters	1	0	0	1
Total					49	3	3	55

=== Assists record ===
As of 7 May 2022

Rank	No.	Nat.	Po.	Name	Championship	FA Cup	EFL Cup	Total
1	26	(England)	LM	Ryan Giles	9	0	0	9
2	8	(England)	CM	Joe Ralls	6	0	0	6
3	21	(England)	CM	Marlon Pack	3	1	0	4
3	39	(Wales)	CF	Isaak Davies	3	1	0	4
5	~~10~~	(Wales)	CF	Kieffer Moore	2	0	1	3
5	17	(England)	RB	Cody Drameh	3	0	0	3
5	22	(England)	CM	Tommy Doyle	3	0	0	3
5	38	(England)	RB	Perry Ng	3	0	0	3
9	3	(Republic of Ireland)	LB	Joel Bagan	2	0	0	2
9	5	(England)	CB	Aden Flint	2	0	0	2
9	6	(Wales)	CM	Will Vaulks	2	0	0	2
12	4	(England)	CB	Sean Morrison	1	0	0	1
12	9	(England)	CF	Jordan Hugill	1	0	0	1
12	15	(England)	DM	Ryan Wintle	1	0	0	1
12	27	(Wales)	AM	Rubin Colwill	1	0	0	1
12	28	(England)	RWB	Tom Sang	0	1	0	1
12	29	(Wales)	SS	Mark Harris	1	0	0	1
12	32	(Wales)	CM	Eli King	1	0	0	1
12	40	(Wales)	LB	Tom Davies	0	1	0	1
Total					44	3	2	49

=== Disciplinary record ===
As of 7 May 2022

Rank	No.	Nat.	Po.	Name	Championship			FA Cup			EFL Cup			Total		
Rank	No.	Nat.	Po.	Name	Yellow card	(yellow card) (yellow-red card)	Red card	Yellow card	(yellow card) (yellow-red card)	Red card	Yellow card	(yellow card) (yellow-red card)	Red card	Yellow card	(yellow card) (yellow-red card)	Red card
1	6	(Wales)	DM	Will Vaulks	9	0	0	1	0	0	1	0	0	11	0	0
1	38	(England)	RB	Perry Ng	10	0	0	1	0	0	0	0	0	11	0	0
3	2	(Republic of Ireland)	CB	Mark McGuinness	9	0	0	0	0	0	0	0	0	9	0	0
3	5	(England)	CB	Aden Flint	8	0	1	0	0	0	0	0	0	8	0	1
5	16	(England)	CB	Curtis Nelson	7	0	0	0	0	0	1	0	0	8	0	0
6	8	(England)	CM	Joe Ralls	7	0	0	0	0	0	0	0	0	7	0	0
7	21	(England)	CM	Marlon Pack	6	0	0	0	0	0	0	0	0	6	0	0
7	29	(Wales)	CF	Mark Harris	6	0	0	0	0	0	0	0	0	6	0	0
9	3	(Republic of Ireland)	LB	Joel Bagan	5	0	0	0	0	0	0	0	0	5	0	0
9	7	(Curaçao)	CM	Leandro Bacuna	4	0	1	0	0	0	0	0	0	4	0	1
9	15	(England)	DM	Ryan Wintle	4	0	0	0	0	0	1	0	0	5	0	0
12	19	(Republic of Ireland)	CF	James Collins	4	0	0	0	0	0	0	0	0	4	0	0
12	22	(England)	CM	Tommy Doyle	4	0	0	0	0	0	0	0	0	4	0	0
14	4	(England)	CB	Sean Morrison	2	0	0	0	0	0	1	0	0	2	0	1
14	9	(England)	CF	Jordan Hugill	3	0	0	0	0	0	0	0	0	3	0	0
14	17	(England)	RB	Cody Drameh	3	0	0	0	0	0	0	0	0	3	0	0
17	10	(Uganda)	CF	Uche Ikpeazu	2	0	0	0	0	0	0	0	0	2	0	0
17	25	(England)	CM	Alex Smithies	2	0	0	0	0	0	0	0	0	2	0	0
17	26	(England)	LM	Ryan Giles	2	0	0	0	0	0	0	0	0	2	0	0
17	42	(Wales)	CB	Oliver Denham	2	0	0	0	0	0	0	0	0	2	0	0
21	1	(England)	GK	Dillon Phillips	1	0	0	0	0	0	0	0	0	1	0	0
21	~~10~~	(Wales)	CF	Kieffer Moore	1	0	0	0	0	0	0	0	0	1	0	0
21	18	(England)	LM	Alfie Doughty	1	0	0	0	0	0	0	0	0	1	0	0
21	27	(Wales)	AM	Rubin Colwill	1	0	0	0	0	0	0	0	0	1	0	0
21	39	(Wales)	CF	Isaak Davies	1	0	0	0	0	0	0	0	0	1	0	0
Total					105	0	3	2	0	0	3	0	0	109	0	3

=== Clean sheets ===
Includes all competitive matches. The list is sorted by squad number when total clean sheets are equal. Numbers in parentheses represent games where both goalkeepers participated and both kept a clean sheet; the number in parentheses is awarded to the goalkeeper who was substituted on, whilst a full clean sheet is awarded to the goalkeeper who was on the field at the start of play.

As of match played 25 February 2023

Rank	No.	Nat.	Name	Matches played	Championship	FA Cup	EFL Cup	Total
1	25	(England)	Alex Smithies	31	5	0	0	5
2	1	(England)	Dillon Phillips	19	2	0	0	2

=== Contracts ===
Date	Position	Nationality	Name	Status	Contract Length	Expiry Date	Ref.
24 August 2021	CF	(England)	Chanka Zimba	Signed	3 years	June 2024	
30 August 2021	AM	(Wales)	Rubin Colwill	Signed	3 years	June 2024	
6 October 2021	LB	(Wales)	Tom Davies	Signed	3 years	June 2024	
3 March 2022	CF	(Wales)	Isaak Davies	Signed	3 years	June 2025	
14 March 2022	CB	(Wales) (England)	Oliver Denham	Signed	2 years	June 2024	

== Transfers ==
=== Transfers in ===
Date	Position	Nationality	Name	From	Fee	Ref.
21 June 2021	CB	(Republic of Ireland)	Mark McGuinness	(England) Arsenal	Undisclosed	
1 July 2021	CF	(Republic of Ireland)	James Collins	(England) Luton Town	Free transfer	
1 July 2021	CB	(England)	James Connolly	(England) Blackburn Rovers	Free transfer	
1 July 2021	GK	(England)	Rohan Luthra	(England) Crystal Palace	Free transfer	
1 July 2021	RB	(England)	Jai Semenyo	(England) Mangotsfield United	Free transfer	
1 July 2021	DM	(England)	Ryan Wintle	(England) Crewe Alexandra	Free transfer	
10 August 2021	RW	(Wales)	Marley Watkins	(England) Bristol City	Free transfer	
2 September 2021	RW	(England)	Jack Leahy	(England) Brighton & Hove Albion	Free transfer	
2 September 2021	GK	(Wales)	Matthew Turner	(England) Leeds United	Free transfer	

=== Loans in ===
Date from	Position	Nationality	Name	From	Date until	Ref.
13 July 2021	LM	(England)	Ryan Giles	(England) Wolverhampton Wanderers	3 January 2022	
12 January 2022	RB	(England)	Cody Drameh	(England) Leeds United	End of season	
20 January 2022	CM	(England)	Tommy Doyle	(England) Manchester City	End of season	
29 January 2022	LM	(England)	Alfie Doughty	(England) Stoke City	End of Season	
30 January 2022	CF	(England)	Jordan Hugill	(England) Norwich City	End of Season	
31 January 2022	CF	(Uganda)	Uche Ikpeazu	(England) Middlesbrough	End of season	

=== Loans out ===
Date from	Position	Nationality	Name	To	Date until	Ref.
8 July 2021	CF	(England)	Max Watters	(England) Milton Keynes Dons	31 December 2021	
31 July 2021	RW	(Northern Ireland)	Gavin Whyte	(England) Oxford United	End of season	
28 August 2021	DM	(England)	Ryan Wintle	(England) Blackpool	3 January 2022	
31 August 2021	LW	(England)	Josh Murphy	(England) Preston North End	End of season	
6 January 2022	CF	(England)	Chanka Zimba	(England) Northampton Town	End of season	
8 January 2022	CB	(Wales)	James Connolly	(England) Bristol Rovers	End of season	
31 January 2022	LB	(Northern Ireland)	Ciaron Brown	(England) Oxford United	End of season	
31 January 2022	AM	(Wales)	Kieron Evans	(Northern Ireland) Linfield	End of season	
31 January 2022	MF	(Wales)	Caleb Hughes	(Wales) Haverfordwest County	End of season	
31 January 2022	MF	(Wales)	Keenan Patten	(England) Hereford	End of season	
31 January 2022	DM	(England)	Tom Sang	(Scotland) St Johnstone	End of season	

=== Transfers out ===
Date	Position	Nationality	Name	To	Fee	Ref.
23 June 2021	CF	(Germany)	Robert Glatzel	(Germany) Hamburger SV	Undisclosed	
30 June 2021	CB	(Ivory Coast)	Sol Bamba	(England) Middlesbrough	Released	
30 June 2021	LB	(England)	Joe Bennett	(England) Wigan Athletic	Released	
30 June 2021	CB	(Wales)	Jack Bodenham	(England) South Shields	Released	
30 June 2021	CM	(Republic of Ireland)	Aaron Bolger	(Republic of Ireland) Cork City	Released	
30 June 2021	GK	(England)	Joe Day	(Wales) Newport County	Released	
30 June 2021	CF	(Wales)	Daniel Griffiths	(England) Chippenham Town	Released	
30 June 2021	LW	(Canada)	Junior Hoilett	(England) Reading	Released	
30 June 2021	CF	(Republic of Ireland)	Rolan Idowu	(Republic of Ireland) Bohemians	Released	
30 June 2021	CB	(Wales)	Ben Margetson	(Wales) Swansea City	Released	
30 June 2021	LB	(England)	Daniel Martin	(England) Torquay United	Released	
30 June 2021	RB	(England)	Cameron McWilliams		Released	
30 June 2021	CB	(Wales)	Ryan Reynolds	(Wales) Penybont	Released	
30 June 2021	AM	(Wales)	James Waite	(Wales) Penybont	Released	
30 June 2021	CF	(Wales)	Jack Williams		Released	
30 June 2021	AM	(Wales)	Jonny Williams	(England) Swindon Town	Released	
26 August 2021	RW	(Wales)	Marley Watkins	(Scotland) Aberdeen	Released	
4 October 2021	SS	(England)	Lee Tomlin	(England) Walsall	Mutual consent	
31 January 2022	CF	(Wales)	Kieffer Moore	(England) Bournemouth	Undisclosed	

== Pre-season friendlies ==
As part of Cardiff City's pre-season preparations, friendlies against Bath City, Cambridge United, Forest Green Rovers, Exeter City, Southampton and Newport County were announced.

10 July 2021 Friendly	Bath City	0–5	Cardiff City	Twerton
15:00 BST		Report	Collins 3', 25'; Denham 18'; Vassell 37'; Davies 88'	Stadium: Twerton Park

17 July 2021 Friendly	Cardiff City	0–2	Cambridge United	Leckwith
13:00 BST		Report	Smith 4'; Weir 57'	Stadium: Cardiff International Sports Stadium

17 July 2021 Friendly	Cardiff City	1–1	Cambridge United	Leckwith
15:00 BST	Zimba 12'	Report	Ironside 2' (pen.)	Stadium: Cardiff International Sports Stadium

20 July 2021 Friendly	Forest Green Rovers	1–2	Cardiff City	Nailsworth
19:00 BST	Matt 58'	Report	Collins 47'; Whyte 84'	Stadium: The Innocent New Lawn

24 July 2021 Friendly	Cardiff City	2–2	Exeter City	Leckwith
15:00 BST	Collins 45'; Harris 63' (pen.)	Report	Jay 22'; Sweeney 49'	Stadium: Cardiff International Sports Stadium

27 July 2021 Friendly	Cardiff City	0–4	Southampton	Leckwith
19:00 BST		Report	Walcott 40'; Djenepo 66'; Adams 74', 85'	Stadium: Cardiff City Stadium

31 July 2021 Friendly	Cardiff City	2–0	Newport County	Leckwith
13:00 BST	Ralls 21'; Harris 82'	Report		Stadium: Cardiff City Stadium

== Competitions ==
=== Overview ===
Competition	First match	Last match	Starting round	Record							
Competition	First match	Last match	Starting round	Pld	W	D	L	GF	GA	GD	Win %
EFL Championship	7 August 2021	May 2022	Matchday 1	46	15	8	23	50	68	−18	32.61
FA Cup	9 January 2022	6 February 2022	Third round	2	1	0	1	3	4	−1	50.00
EFL Cup	10 August 2021	24 August 2021	First round	2	1	0	1	3	4	−1	50.00
Total				50	17	8	25	56	76	−20	34.00

Last updated: 7 May 2022
Source: Competitions

=== EFL Championship ===
==== League table ====
Pos	Team	Pld	W	D	L	GF	GA	GD	Pts
15	Swansea City	46	16	13	17	58	68	−10	61
16	Blackpool	46	16	12	18	54	58	−4	60
17	Bristol City	46	15	10	21	62	77	−15	55
18	Cardiff City	46	15	8	23	50	68	−18	53
19	Hull City	46	14	9	23	41	54	−13	51
20	Birmingham City	46	11	14	21	50	75	−25	47
21	Reading	46	13	8	25	54	87	−33	41 (Note: Reading were deducted 6 points for breach of profit and sustainability regulations.)

Source: EFL Official Website
Rules for classification: 1) Points; 2) Goal difference; 3) Number of goals scored; 4) Head-to-head results; 5) Wins; 6) Away goals; 7) Penalty points (sec 9.5); 8) 12-point sending off offences

==== Results summary ====
Overall								Home						Away					
Pld	W	D	L	GF	GA	GD	Pts	W	D	L	GF	GA	GD	W	D	L	GF	GA	GD
46	15	8	23	50	68	−18	53	7	4	12	22	29	−7	8	4	11	28	39	−11

Last updated: 7 May 2022.

==== Results by matchday ====
Matchday	1	2	3	4	5	6	7	8	9	10	11	12	13	14	15	16	17	18	19	20	21	22	23	24	25	26	27	28	29	30	31	32	33	34	35	36	37	38	39	40	41	42	43	44	45	46
Ground	H	A	A	H	H	A	A	H	A	H	H	A	A	H	A	H	H	A	H	A	H	A	A	A	H	A	H	A	H	A	H	H	A	H	H	A	H	H	H	A	A	H	A	A	H	A
Result	D	W	D	W	L	W	L	L	L	L	L	L	L	L	D	L	W	W	L	W	L	D	L	D	L	L	W	W	W	L	W	D	L	L	W	W	D	W	L	W	L	L	L	L	D	W
Position	13	3	9	6	9	8	9	10	13	18	20	20	21	21	21	21	20	19	20	20	21	20	20	20	20	20	20	20	20	20	19	19	19	20	18	17	17	17	17	17	17	17	19	19	19	18

Updated to match(es) played on 30 April 2022. Source:
A = Away; H = Home; W = Win; D = Draw; L = Loss

==== Matches ====
Cardiff City's fixtures were announced on 24 June 2021.

7 August 2021 1	Cardiff City	1–1	Barnsley	Leckwith
15:00 BST	Pack 54'	BBC Report	Sibbick 69'	Stadium: Cardiff City Stadium; Attendance: 17,431; Referee: Stephen Martin (Staffordshire)

14 August 2021 2	Blackpool	0–2	Cardiff City	Blackpool
15:00 BST	Husband (yellow card) 90+2'	BBC Report	Bacuna 52'; Moore 86'	Stadium: Bloomfield Road; Attendance: 11,393; Referee: Andy Woolmer (Northamptonshire)

18 August 2021 3	Peterborough United	2–2	Cardiff City	Peterborough
19:45 BST	Burrows 49'; Dembélé 51'; Ward (yellow card) 86'	BBC Report	Pack (yellow card) 44'; Flint (yellow card) 45', (goal) 83', 90+6'	Stadium: London Road Stadium; Attendance: 8,534; Referee: Thomas Bramall (South Yorkshire)

21 August 2021 4	Cardiff City	3–1	Millwall	Leckwith
15:00 BST	Flint (yellow card) 51', (goal) 66', 70'; Morrison 83'; Nelson (yellow card) 86'	BBC Report	Cooper (yellow card) 65'; Afobe 76'	Stadium: Cardiff City Stadium; Attendance: 18,168; Referee: James Linington (Isle of Wight)

28 August 2021 5	Cardiff City	1–2	Bristol City	Cardiff
12:30 BST	Bentley 59' (o.g.); Morrison (yellow card) 74'; Ralls (yellow card) 87'	BBC Report	Weimann 21', 70'; Semenyo (yellow card) 74'; Martin (yellow card) 74'	Stadium: Cardiff City Stadium; Attendance: 20,891; Referee: David Webb (County Durham)

12 September 2021 6	Nottingham Forest	1–2	Cardiff City	West Bridgford
14:30 BST	Grabban 23'	BBC Report	Vaulks (yellow card) 33'; Colwill 58', 73'; Pack (yellow card) 75'; Ng (yellow card) 76'	Stadium: The City Ground; Attendance: 24,153; Referee: Dean Whitestone (Northampton)
Note: Live on Sky Sports Football

15 September 2021 7	Coventry City	1–0	Cardiff City	Coventry
19:45 BST	Gyökeres 15'; Kane (yellow card) 73'; Hamer (yellow card) 90+1'; Dabo (red card) 90+2'	Sky Report; BBC Report	Moore (yellow card) 69'	Stadium: Coventry Building Society Arena; Attendance: 16,372; Referee: Michael Salisbury (Preston)

18 September 2021 8	Cardiff City	0–1	Bournemouth	Cardiff
15:00 BST	Harris (yellow card) 36'; Nelson (yellow card) 45+1'; Bacuna (yellow card) 88'	Sky Report; BBC Report	Christie (yellow card) 24'; Lerma (yellow card) 52'; Billing 54'; Smith (yellow card) 88'	Stadium: Cardiff City Stadium; Attendance: 19,090; Referee: Josh Smith (London)

25 September 2021 9	Blackurn Rovers	5–1	Cardiff City	Blackburn
15:00 BST	Gallagher 24'; Brereton 32', 45+2', 90' (pen.); Dolan 53'	BBC Report; Sky Report	Flint (yellow card) 8'; Morrison 58'; Dillon Phillips (yellow card) 89'	Stadium: Ewood Park; Attendance: 11,670; Referee: Keith Stroud (Hampshire)

28 September 2021 10	Cardiff City	0–4	West Bromwich Albion	Cardiff
19:45 BST	Collins (yellow card) 39'	BBC Report; Sky Report	Grant 5'; Bartley (yellow card) 42'; Nelson 56' (o.g.); Mowatt 75'; Phillips 82'	Stadium: Cardiff City Stadium; Attendance: 17,363; Referee: Graham Scott (Oxfordshire)

2 October 2021 11	Cardiff City	0–1	Reading	Cardiff
15:00 BST	Pack (yellow card) 32'; Ralls (yellow card) 37'; Collins (yellow card) 84'; McGuinness (yellow card) 90+4'	BBC Report; Sky Report	Hoilett 38'	Stadium: Cardiff City Stadium; Attendance: 18,400; Referee: Thomas Bramall (South Yorkshire)

17 October 2021 12	Swansea City	3–0	Cardiff City	Swansea
12:00 BST	Paterson 29'; Piroe 60'; Manning (yellow card) 63'; Bidwell 74'	BBC Report; Sky report	Bacuna (yellow card) 26'; Vaulks (yellow card) 90+1'	Stadium: Swansea.com Stadium; Attendance: 19,288; Referee: James Linington (Isle of Wight)
Note: Live on Sky Sports

20 October 2021 13	Fulham	2–0	Cardiff City	London
19:45 BST	Cairney 57'; Mitrovic 63'	BBC Report; Sky Report	Pack (yellow card) 69'; Bagan (yellow card) 78'; Ng (yellow card) 85'	Stadium: Craven Cottage; Attendance: 15,789; Referee: Tim Robinson (West Sussex)

23 October 2021 14	Cardiff City	0–2	Middlesbrough	Cardiff
12:30 BST	Pack (yellow card) 28'; McGuinness (yellow card) 34'; Flint (yellow card) 70'	BBC Report; Sky Report	Šporar 35' (pen.); Ikpeazu (yellow card) 38'; Payero 74'	Stadium: Cardiff City Stadium; Attendance: 17,513; Referee: Jeremy Simpson (Lancashire)
Note: Live on Sky Sports

30 October 2021 15	Stoke City	3–3	Cardiff City	Stoke-on-Trent
15:00 BST	Brown 9'; Fletcher 16', 46'; Wilmot (yellow card) 62'; Souttar (yellow card) 64'; Surridge (yellow card) 83'	BBC Report; Sky Report	Nelson (yellow card) 39'; Bacuna (yellow card) 57'; Colwill 66'; Harris 70', (yellow card) 89'; Moore 71'	Stadium: Bet365 Stadium; Attendance: 21,413; Referee: John Brooks

3 November 2021 16	Cardiff City	0–1	Queens Park Rangers	Cardiff
19:45 GMT		BBC Report; Sky Report	Gray 37'; Dickie (yellow card) 47'; Adomah (yellow card) 85'	Stadium: Cardiff City Stadium; Attendance: 16,882; Referee: Andy Woolmer (Northamptonshire)

6 November 2021 17	Cardiff City	2–1	Huddersfield Town	Cardiff
15:00 GMT	McGuiness (yellow card) 60'; Moore 74', 90+3'; Bacuna (yellow card) 84'; Vaulks (yellow card) 90+1'; Ng (yellow card) 90+5'	BBC Report; Sky Report	Sinani 12'; High (yellow card) 90+4'	Stadium: Cardiff City Stadium; Attendance: 17,355; Referee: David Webb (County Durham)

20 November 2021 18	Preston North End	1–2	Cardiff City	Preston
15:00 GMT	Maguire 2'; Cunningham (yellow card) 57'; Iversen (yellow card) 66'	BBC Report; Sky Report	Ng (yellow card) 35'; McGuinness 51'; Collins 66'; Colwill (yellow card) 87'; Harris (yellow card) 88'	Stadium: Deepdale; Attendance: 10,749; Referee: Leigh Doughty (Blackpool)

24 November 2021 19	Cardiff City	0–1	Hull City	Cardiff
19:45 GMT	McGuinness (yellow card) 57'; Giles (yellow card) 90+4'	BBC Report; Sky Report	Lewis-Potter 15', (yellow card) 55'; Greaves (yellow card) 90+4'	Stadium: Cardiff City Stadium; Attendance: 17,180; Referee: Thomas Bramall (South Yorkshire)

27 November 2021 20	Luton Town	1–2	Cardiff City	Luton
15:00 GMT	Rea (yellow card) 42'; Clark 64'	BBC Report; Sky Report	Colwill 10'; Morrison (yellow card) 38', (goal) 77'; Smithies (yellow card) 85'	Stadium: Kenilworth Road; Attendance: 9,987; Referee: Oliver Langford (West Midlands)

4 December 2021 21	Cardiff City	2–3	Sheffield United	Leckwith
15:00 GMT	Harris 32'; Collins (yellow card) 44'; Morrison (red card) 52'; McGuinness 90'	BBC Report; Sky Report	Norwood (yellow card) 40'; Gibbs-White 61'; Sharp 73'; McGoldrick 75'	Stadium: Cardiff City Stadium; Attendance: 18,310; Referee: John Busby (Oxfordshire)

11 December 2021 22	Birmingham City	2–2	Cardiff City	Birmingham
15:00 GMT	Deeney 29'; Šunjić 45+1', (yellow card) 63'; Friend (yellow card) 85'	BBC Report; Sky Report	Nelson (yellow card) 16'; Moore 66'; Ralls (yellow card) 72'; McGuinness 90+1'	Stadium: St Andrew's; Attendance: 17,840; Referee: Jeremy Simpson (Lancashire)

30 December 2021 23	Bournemouth	3–0	Cardiff City	Kings Park
19:45 GMT	Christie 25'; Solanke (yellow card) 45+3', (goal) 68'; Smithies 83' (o.g.)	BBC Report; Sky Report	Harris (yellow card) 27'; Bacuna (red card) 45+2'; Nelson (yellow card) 45+3'	Stadium: Vitality Stadium; Attendance: 8,942; Referee: James Linington (Isle of Wight)

2 January 2022 24	West Bromwich Albion	1–1	Cardiff City	West Bromwich
14:00 GMT	Bartley (yellow card) 23'; Robinson 48'; Mowatt (red card) 76'; Molumby (yellow card) 84'; Johnstone (red card) 90+6'	BBC Report; Sky Report	Giles (yellow card) 27'; Collins 34'; McGuinness (yellow card) 90+4'; Flint (red card) 90+6'	Stadium: The Hawthorns; Attendance: 22,925; Referee: Thomas Bramall (South Yorkshire)

15 January 2022 25	Cardiff City	0–1	Blackburn Rovers	Cardiff
12:30 GMT	Drameh (yellow card) 41'; Ng (yellow card) 59'; Collins (yellow card) 72'; Pack (yellow card) 90+5'	BBC report Sky report	Rothwell 14' van Hecke (yellow card) 42'; Travis (yellow card) 50'; Lenihan (yellow card) 55'; Nymabe (yellow card) 59' (yellow-red card) 76'; Wharton (yellow card) 76'; Kaminski (yellow card) 90+2'	Stadium: Cardiff City Stadium; Attendance: 0 Referee: Matt Donohue (Manchester)

22 January 2022 26	Bristol City	3–2	Cardiff City	Bristol
12:30 GMT	Martin 33', 63'; Pring (yellow card) 73'; Weimann 77'	BBC report Sky Report	Collins (yellow card) 23', (goal) 31'; Ralls (yellow card) 44'; Watters 90'	Stadium: Ashton Gate Stadium; Attendance: 21,435; Referee: Gavin Ward (Surrey)

30 January 2022 27	Cardiff City	2–1	Nottingham Forest	Cardiff
16:00 GMT	Hugill 6'; Drameh (yellow card) 52'; Davies 65'; Wintle (yellow card) 83'	BBC report Sky report	Colback (yellow card) 27'; Davis 90+4'	Stadium: Cardiff City Stadium; Attendance: 18,866; Referee: David Webb (County Durham)
Note: Live on Sky Sports

2 February 2022 28	Barnsley	0–1	Cardiff City	Barnsley
19:45 GMT	Andersen (yellow card) 59'; Jordan Williams (yellow card) 64'	BBC Report; Sky report	McGuinness (yellow card) 39'; Doyle (yellow card) 66'; Ikpeazu 71', (yellow card) 72'; Flint (yellow card) 90+2'	Stadium: Oakwell; Attendance: 11,432; Referee: Geoff Eltringham (County Durham)

9 February 2022 29	Cardiff City	4–0	Peterborough United	Cardiff
19:45 GMT	Ralls 4'; Flint 39'; Doyle (yellow card) 44'; Ng (yellow card) 52'; Hugill 57'; Wintle (yellow card) 74'; Ikpeazu 85'	BBC Report; Sky report	Mumba (yellow card) 32'	Stadium: Cardiff City Stadium; Attendance: 17,297; Referee: Kevin Friend (Leicestershire)

12 February 2022 30	Millwall	2–1	Cardiff City	Bermondsey
15:00 GMT	Wallace (yellow card) 53', (goal) 73'; Bennett 82'	BBC report Sky report	Bagan 90+2'	Stadium: The Den; Attendance: 12,710; Referee: Steve Martin (Staffordshire)

15 February 2022 31	Cardiff City	2–0	Coventry City	Cardiff
19:45 GMT	Flint (yellow card) 59'; Wintle (yellow card) 60'; Bagan 72'; Harris 87'	BBC Report; Sky report	McFadzean (yellow card) 78'	Stadium: Cardiff City Stadium; Attendance: 18,660; Referee: John Busby (Oxfordshire)
Note: Live on Sky TV

19 February 2022 32	Cardiff City	1–1	Blackpool	Cardiff
15:00 GMT	Bagan 49'; Flint (yellow card) 61'; Vaulks (yellow card) 82'; Ng (yellow card) 85'	BBC Report; Sky report	Ekpiteta 11'; Bowler (yellow card) 66'	Stadium: Cardiff City Stadium; Attendance: 19,025; Referee: Darren Bond (Lancashire)

23 February 2022 33	Huddersfield Town	2–1	Cardiff City	Huddersfield
19:45 GMT	Koroma 88'; Russell (yellow card) 90+1', (goal) 90+6'; Thomas (yellow card) 90+8'	BBC report Sky report	McGuinness (yellow card) 13'; Doyle 61', (yellow card) 76'; Harris (yellow card) 74'; Hugill (yellow card) 79'; Bagan (yellow card) 85'; Smithies (yellow card) 90+2'; Vaulks (yellow card) 90+5'	Stadium: John Smith's Stadium; Attendance: 20,167; Referee: Oliver Langford (West Midlands)

26 February 2022 34	Cardiff City	0–1	Fulham	Cardiff
15:00 GMT		BBC report Sky report	Mitrovic 41'	Stadium: Cardiff City Stadium; Attendance: 18,928; Referee: Leigh Doughty (Lancashire)

1 March 2022 35	Cardiff City	1–0	Derby County	Cardiff
19:45 GMT	Davies (yellow card) 26'; Ikpeazu 85'; Doughty (yellow card) 90+2'	BBC Report; Sky report	Buchanan (yellow card) 52'; Davies (yellow card) 62'; Bird (yellow card) 80'; Ebosele (yellow card) 90+3'	Stadium: Cardiff City Stadium; Attendance: 18,767; Referee: Andy Davies (Hampshire)
Note: Live on Sky TV

5 March 2022 36	Queens Park Rangers	1–2	Cardiff City	White City, London
15:00 GMT	Gray 38'	BBC report Sky report	Davies 70'; Colwill 74'	Stadium: Kiyan Prince Foundation Stadium; Attendance: 16,170; Referee: Michael Salisbury (Preston)

12 March 2022 37	Cardiff City	0–0	Preston North End	Cardiff
15:00 GMT	Hugill (yellow card) 68'; Ralls (yellow card) 71'	BBC Report; Sky report	Hughes (yellow card) 51'; Potts (yellow card) 90+3'	Stadium: Cardiff City Stadium; Attendance: 19,743; Referee: James Linington (Isle of Wight)

16 March 2022 38	Cardiff City	2–1	Stoke City	Cardiff
19:45 GMT	Doyle 39'; Hugill 43', (yellow card) 68'	BBC Report; Sky report	Baker 23'	Stadium: Cardiff City Stadium; Attendance: 17,184; Referee: Andy Woolmer (Northamptonshire)

2 April 2022 39	Cardiff City	0–4	Swansea City	Cardiff
15:00 BST	Doyle (yellow card) 39'; Ralls (yellow card) 80'	BBC report Sky report	Obafemi 6', 82'; Wolf (yellow card) 29', (goal) 78'; Cabango 57'; Downes (yellow card) 69'; Piroe (yellow card) 80'	Stadium: Cardiff City Stadium; Attendance: 27,280; Referee: Josh Smith (London)

9 April 2022 40	Reading	1–2	Cardiff City	Reading
15:00 BST	João 7'	BBC report Sky report	Doughty 59'; Ng (yellow card) 70'; Vaulks 85'	Stadium: Select Car Leasing Stadium; Attendance: 19,039; Referee: Michael Salisbury (Preston)

15 April 2022 41	Hull City	2–1	Cardiff City	Kingston upon Hull
15:00 BST	Sayyadmanesh 8'; Coyle 11'	BBC report Sky report	Ikpeazu (yellow card) 36'; Denham (yellow card) 45+1'; Flint (yellow card) 70', (goal) 81'	Stadium: MKM Stadium; Attendance: 15,685; Referee: Steve Martin (Staffordshire)

18 April 2022 42	Cardiff City	0–1	Luton Town	Cardiff
15:00 BST	Bagan (yellow card) 55'	BBC report SKY report	Cornick 71'; Naismith (yellow card) 90+3'	Stadium: Cardiff City Stadium; Attendance: 19,381; Referee: Andy Davies (Hampshire)

23 April 2022 43	Sheffield United	1–0	Cardiff City	Sheffield
15:00 BST	Ndiaye 47'; Norwood (yellow card) 67'	BBC Report; Sky report	Bagan (yellow card) 57'; McGuinness (yellow card) 60'; Ng (yellow card) 71'	Stadium: Bramall Lane; Attendance: 26,802; Referee: Oliver Langford (West Midlands)

27 April 2022 44	Middlesbrough	2–0	Cardiff City	Middlesbrough
19:45 BST	Tavernier 28'; McGree 53'; Jones (yellow card) 88'; Howson (yellow card) 90'	BBC report Sky report	Nelson (yellow card) 27'; Wintle (yellow card) 33'; Denham (yellow card) 62'; Vaulks (yellow card) 90'	Stadium: Riverside Stadium; Attendance: 19,727; Referee: Matt Donohue (Manchester)
Note: Live on Sky TV

30 April 2022 45	Cardiff City	1–1	Birmingham City	Cardiff
15:00 BST	McGuinness (yellow card) 48'; Drameh (yellow card) 57'; Nelson (yellow card) 67'; Vaulks (yellow card) 76', (goal) 82' (pen.)	BBC Sport; Sky report	Bela 22'; Gordon (yellow card) 58'; Etheridge (yellow card) 82'	Stadium: Cardiff City Stadium; Attendance: 21,395; Referee: John Busby (Oxfordshire)

7 May 2022 46	Derby County	0–1	Cardiff City	Derby
12:30 BST	Thompson (yellow card) 73'	BBC Report; Sky report	Hugill 55'; Ng (yellow card) 69'; Harris (yellow card) 81'	Stadium: Pride Park Stadium; Attendance: 29,402; Referee: Keith Stroud (Hampshire)

=== FA Cup ===
Cardiff were drawn at home to Preston North End in the third round.

9 January 2022 Third round	Cardiff City	2–1 (a.e.t.)	Preston North End	Leckwith
14:00 GMT	Davies 42'; Ng (yellow card) 63'; Harris 116'	BBC report Sky report	Johnson 53' (pen.); Browne (yellow card) 113'	Stadium: Cardiff City Stadium; Attendance: 0 (Behind-closed-doors); Referee: Andy Woolmer (Northamptonshire)
Note: Live on S4C

6 February 2022 Fourth round	Liverpool	3–1	Cardiff City	Liverpool
12:00 GMT	Jota 53'; Minamino 68'; Elliott 76'	BBC report	Colwill 80'	Stadium: Anfield; Attendance: 51,268; Referee: Andy Madley (Yorkshire)
Note: Live on ITV

=== EFL Cup ===
Cardiff City were drawn at home to Sutton United in the first round and Brighton & Hove Albion in the second round.

10 August 2021 First round	Cardiff City	3–2	Sutton United	Leckwith
19:00 BST	Watkins 44', 50'; Murphy 84'	Report	Wilson 4'; Milsom (yellow card) 21'; Eastmond (yellow card) 55'; Rowe 90'	Stadium: Cardiff City Stadium; Attendance: 3500; Referee: Josh Smith

24 August 2021 Second round	Cardiff City	0–2	Brighton & Hove Albion	Leckwith
19:45 BST	Vaulks (yellow card) 56'; Wintle (yellow card) 73'; Nelson (yellow card) 78'	Report	Moder 9'; Zeqiri 55'	Stadium: Cardiff City Stadium; Attendance: 6,013; Referee: James Bell

== Summary ==
Games played	50 (46 EFL Championship, 2 FA Cup, 2 League Cup)
Games won	17 (15 EFL Championship, 1 FA Cup, 1 League Cup)
Games drawn	8 (8 EFL Championship, 0 FA Cup, 0 League Cup)
Games lost	25 (23 EFL Championship, 1 FA Cup, 1 League Cup)
Goals scored	56 (50 EFL Championship, 3 FA Cup, 3 League Cup)
Goals conceded	75 (68 EFL Championship,4 FA Cup, 4 League Cup)
Goal difference	-19
Clean sheets	7 (7 EFL Championship, 0 FA Cup, 0 League Cup)
Yellow cards	109 (105 EFL Championship, 2 FA Cup, 3 League Cup)
Red cards	2 (2 EFL Championship, 0 FA Cup, 0 League Cup)
Worst Discipline	(Wales) Will Vaulks (11 (yellow card) , 0 (yellow card) (yellow-red card) , 0 (red card) )
Best result	4–0 vs. Peterborough United (09 Feb 22)
Worst result	1–5 vs. Blackburn Rovers (25 Sep 21); 0–4 vs. West Bromwich Albion (28 Sep 21); 0–4 vs. Swansea City (2 Apr 22)
Most appearances	(England) Aden Flint (39 starts, 3 subs)
Top scorer	(Wales) Rubin Colwill (6)
Most Clean Sheets	(England) Alex Smithies (5)
Points	53

== Club staff ==
=== Backroom staff ===
Position	Name
Manager	(Wales) Steve Morison
Assistant manager	(Wales) Tom Ramasut
First-team coach	(England) Mark Hudson
Goalkeeper coach	(Wales) Andy Dibble
Head of medical services	(England) Matthew May
Club doctor	(Wales) Dr. Len Nokes
First-team physiotherapist	(Wales) James Rowland
Head of Fitness & Conditioning	(England) Lee Southernwood
Senior Strength & Conditioning	(Wales) Mike Beere
Sports scientist	(Wales) Ben Parry
Head scout	(England) Glyn Chamberlain
First Team Analyst	(Wales) Jack Radusin
Player Liaison Officer	(Wales) Jack Osmond-Smith
Kit and Equipment Manager	(Wales) Paul Carter

=== Board of directors ===
Position	Name
Chairman	(Cyprus) Mehmet Dalman
General Manager	(Malaysia) Ken Choo
Finance Director	(Wales) Philip Jenkins
Non-Executive; Board Members; Football Club	(Wales) Steve Borley (since 1998) (Malaysia) Derek Chee Seng Chin (since 2010) (Malaysia) Veh Ken Choo (since 2016) (Cyprus) Mehmet Dalman (since 2012) (United Kingdom) Marco Ronaldo Mario Caramella (since 2017)
Non-Executive; Board Members; Cardiff City (Holdings)	(Malaysia) Danni Rais (since 2012)
Club Secretary	(England) Michelle McDonald
