= Joe Ralls =

English footballer

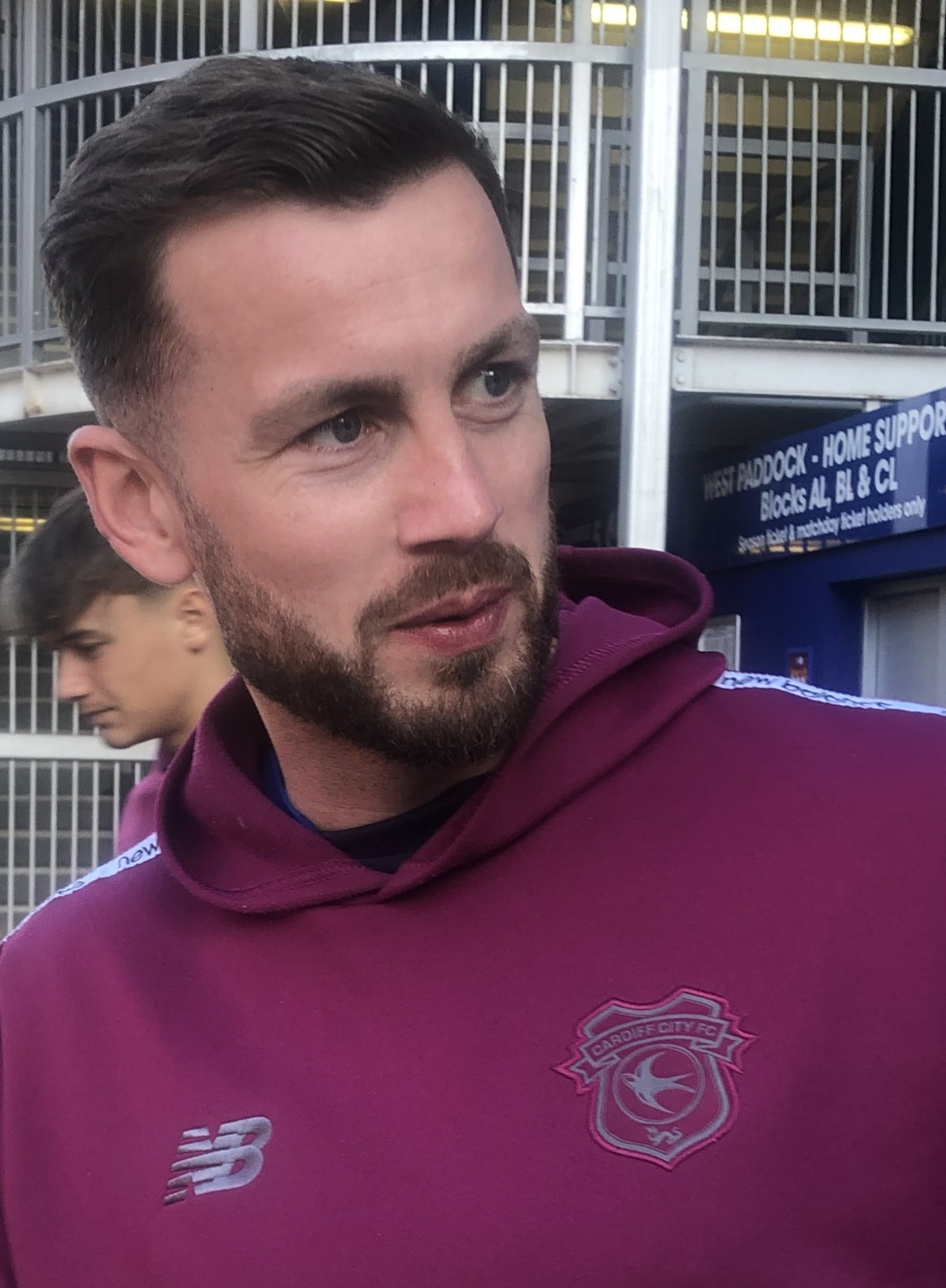
- Ralls with Cardiff City in 2025

Personal information
- Full name: Joseph William Ralls
- Date of birth: 12 October 1993 (age 33)
- Place of birth: Aldershot, England
- Height: 5 ft 10 in (1.78 m)
- Position: Midfielder

Youth career
- Badshot Lea
- Aldershot Town
- 2008–2010: Farnborough
- 2010–2011: Cardiff City

Senior career*
| Years | Team | Apps | (Gls) |
| 2011–2025 | Cardiff City | 384 | (32) |
| 2013–2014 | → Yeovil Town (loan) | 37 | (3) |
| 2025–2026 | Plymouth Argyle | 10 | (1) |

International career
| 2012 | England U19 | 1 | (0) |
- * Club domestic league appearances and goals as of 24 January 2026 (UTC)

Joseph William Ralls (born 12 October 1993) is an English professional footballer who last played as a midfielder for EFL League One club Plymouth Argyle.

After playing at youth level for local teams Aldershot Town and Farnborough, Ralls joined the youth academy at Cardiff City after being spotted by scouts from the club. He made his professional debut for the Bluebirds in August 2011 before joining Yeovil Town on a season-long loan deal for the 2013–14 season to gain experience. After fourteen years with Cardiff, he departed the club following the conclusion of the 2024–25 season.

== Career ==
=== Cardiff City ===
Ralls began his career at Badshot Lea, before later joining Aldershot Town, where he played one game for the first-team in an Aldershot Senior Cup tie against Bagshot at the age of just 15 after a number of senior players were rested, before joining Farnborough under-16s. After he was spotted by Cardiff City scouts along with Jordan Carter, a small compensation was paid by Cardiff to sign the two players. He had previously agreed to play in a trial match for Premier League club Fulham, although this was postponed before he joined Cardiff. He also attracted interest from Everton and Notts County. Then Cardiff academy manager Neal Ardley has stated that he had to convince other staff at the club about Ralls after he declared his intention to offer him a contract. Following his departure from the club, Farnborough youth coach Aidan Whelan commented "We realised from when he first joined us that he has a real talent. He was head and shoulders above players at the same age level".

After Cardiff were left with a depleted squad due to international call-ups prior to a Football League Cup tie against Oxford United on 10 August 2011, manager Malky Mackay approached Ardley to enquire which players in the academy set-up would be ready to step into the first-team for the match. Ardley recommended Ralls, Deji Oshilaja and Mamadou Diallo to Mackay and Ralls and Oshilaja were eventually named on the substitutes bench for the match. Mackay later revealed that he knew very little about Ralls prior to his inclusion in the match. Ralls was brought on after 67 minutes in place of Andrew Taylor to make his professional debut at the age of 17 as Cardiff went on to win 3–1 in extra-time. He was handed his first start in the second round of the competition against Huddersfield Town 13 days later, playing 81 minutes before being replaced by Peter Whittingham.

His progression into the first-team saw him handed his first professional contract by the club on 30 September 2011, later commenting "It's a fantastic feeling to have signed professionally with a club like Cardiff City". Ralls made his league debut just 48 hours after signing the contract, being brought on after just 10 minutes of a match against Hull City following an injury to forward Kenny Miller, scoring a stunning volley for his first senior goal as Cardiff went on to lose 2–1. His first league start came on 10 December in a goalless draw at Millwall, going on to finish his first season in the first-team squad having made 14 appearances in all competitions.

==== Loan to Yeovil Town ====
Following Cardiff's promotion to the Premier League at the end of the 2012–13 season, Ralls was made available for loan due to the lack of first-team opportunities available in the top tier, joining newly promoted Championship club Yeovil Town on loan on 14 August until January 2014 to gain experience. He made his debut for the club on 17 August after coming on as a substitute in place of Kevin Dawson during a 2–0 defeat to Burnley. He scored his first goal for the Glovers in his fourth appearance for the club on 14 September, netting his team's only goal in a 1–1 draw with Sheffield Wednesday, the first goal the team had scored since Ed Upson's winning goal on the opening day of the season a month previously.

Ralls expressed his satisfaction with joining the Glovers, stating "Yeovil has worked out really well and I know I'll improve my game here before I return to Cardiff." He briefly returned to Cardiff following the expiration of his loan deal following the appointment of Ole Gunnar Solskjær as Cardiff manager in order for the Norwegian to assess his squad, missing Yeovil's FA Cup victory over Leyton Orient. However, with Yeovil keen on extending the loan deal, on 11 January 2014, Ralls agreed an extension to his loan with Yeovil until the end of the season.

==== Return to Cardiff ====
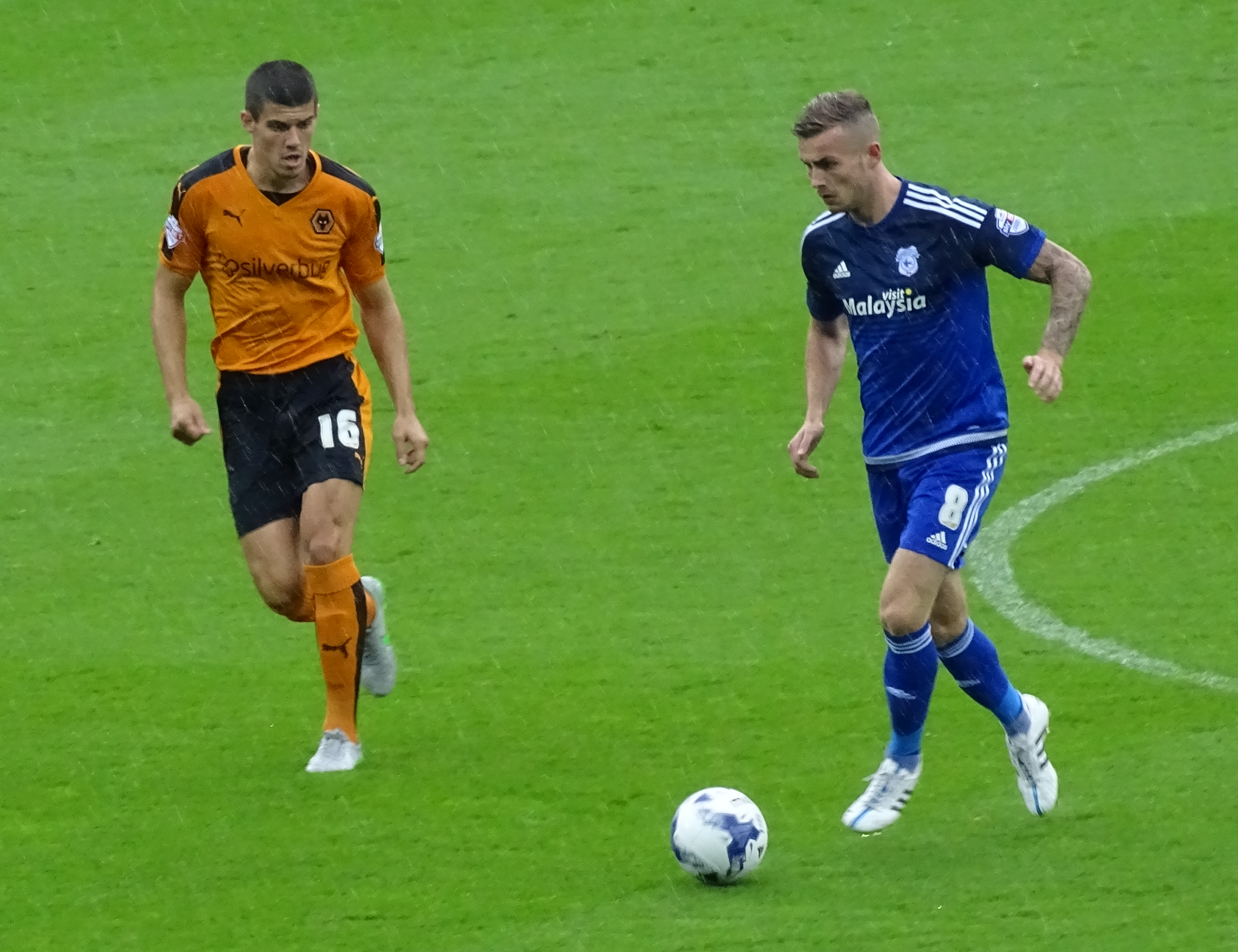
Ralls (right, in blue) on the ball against Conor Coady (left, in yellow) in a match against Wolverhampton Wanderers.

His performances during his loan spell with Yeovil saw Cardiff manager Solskjær to offer Ralls a three-year extension to his contract at the Cardiff City Stadium on his return to the club and was awarded the man of the match award in his first appearance of the 2014–15 season, during a 2–1 victory over Coventry City in the first round of the Football League Cup. Despite the departure of Solskjær soon after, Ralls continued to thrive under newly appointed Cardiff boss Russell Slade, becoming a regular in the first team during the 2014–15 season, playing mostly as a left-sided midfielder due to intense competition for places in the centre of midfield from Peter Whittingham and Aron Gunnarsson, altogether playing 31 games and scoring 4 goals, before being handed a new five-year contract with the club set to run until 2020, to which manager Slade stated that he was "delighted" to keep Ralls at the club.

At the start of the following season, he was handed the number 8 shirt and started in the left-sided midfield role against Fulham on the opening day. Ralls scored his only goal of the campaign in January against Wolverhampton Wanderers in a 3–1 win. Ralls effort throughout the season had earned him the Young Player of the year award, whilst Cardiff just missed out on a play-off place to Sheffield Wednesday.

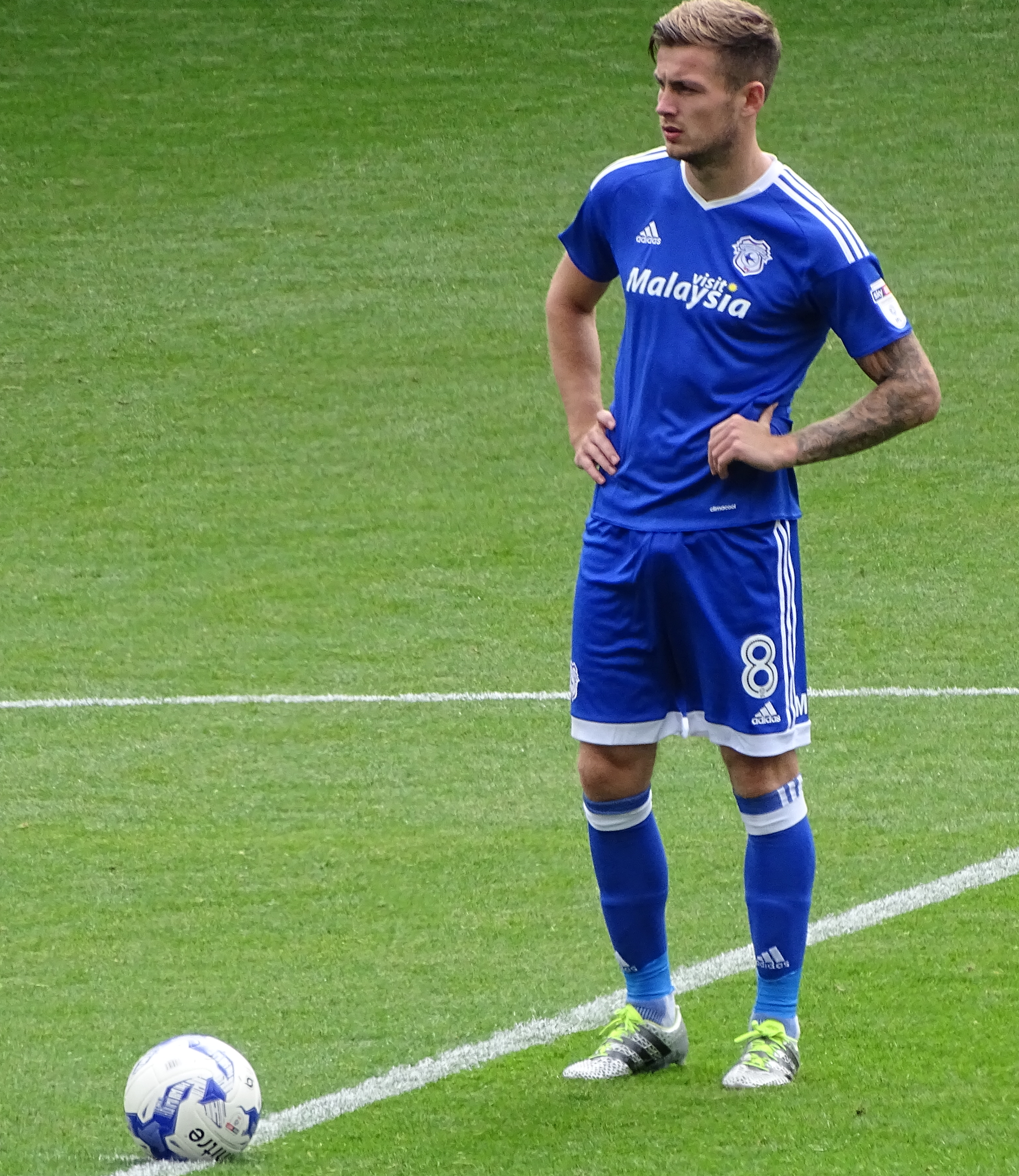
Ralls playing for Cardiff City in 2016.

Ralls celebrated his 100th appearance for Cardiff, by scoring a spectacular goal from 25 yards out against Fulham in August, also opening his accounts for the 2016–17 season. He was nominated for Player of the Month in January, following impressive performances scoring two against Aston Villa and Reading and seeing Cardiff rise from the relegation battle to mid-table spot.

In June 2022, Ralls signed a new two-year contract with the club.

On 21 June 2025, Cardiff announced that Ralls would be leaving at the end of the month when his contract expired.

=== Plymouth Argyle ===
On 5 November 2025, Ralls joined League One club Plymouth Argyle on a short-term contract until January 2026. On 3 January 2026, he signed a contract extension until the end of the season. He was offered a further contract extension by Plymouth in May 2026, but no agreement was reached.

== International career ==
Ralls received his first international call for the England Under-19s to replace the injured Robert Hall to play Czech Republic in February 2012. Ralls came on in the games to make his English debut.

== Style of play ==
Primarily a central midfielder, Ralls featured frequently at left midfield and left-back during the early stages of his career at Cardiff City and Yeovil, commenting that, although not a natural in either position, he can "do a job there" but admitted that he does "naturally tend to drift inside" when playing out of position. Ralls has described himself as a box-to-box midfielder that "likes to get forward as much as possible".

== Career statistics ==
As of 24 January 2026

Appearances and goals by club, season and competition
| Club | Season | League | | | FA Cup | | League Cup | | Other | | Total | |
| Club | Season | Division | Apps | Goals | Apps | Goals | Apps | Goals | Apps | Goals | Apps | Goals |
|---|---|---|---|---|---|---|---|---|---|---|---|---|
| Cardiff City | 2011–12 | Championship | 10 | 1 | 0 | 0 | 4 | 0 | — | | 14 | 1 |
| Cardiff City | 2012–13 | Championship | 4 | 0 | 1 | 0 | 1 | 0 | — | | 6 | 0 |
| Cardiff City | 2013–14 | Premier League | 0 | 0 | 0 | 0 | 0 | 0 | — | | 0 | 0 |
| Cardiff City | 2014–15 | Championship | 28 | 2 | 1 | 1 | 2 | 1 | — | | 31 | 4 |
| Cardiff City | 2015–16 | Championship | 43 | 1 | 0 | 0 | 1 | 0 | — | | 44 | 1 |
| Cardiff City | 2016–17 | Championship | 42 | 6 | 1 | 0 | 1 | 0 | — | | 44 | 6 |
| Cardiff City | 2017–18 | Championship | 37 | 7 | 2 | 0 | 1 | 0 | — | | 40 | 7 |
| Cardiff City | 2018–19 | Premier League | 28 | 0 | 1 | 0 | 0 | 0 | — | | 29 | 0 |
| Cardiff City | 2019–20 | Championship | 27 | 7 | 2 | 0 | 0 | 0 | 2 (Note: Appearances in Championship play-offs) | 0 | 31 | 7 |
| Cardiff City | 2020–21 | Championship | 39 | 5 | 1 | 0 | 0 | 0 | — | | 40 | 5 |
| Cardiff City | 2021–22 | Championship | 29 | 1 | 0 | 0 | 0 | 0 | — | | 29 | 1 |
| Cardiff City | 2022–23 | Championship | 41 | 1 | 1 | 0 | 1 | 0 | — | | 43 | 1 |
| Cardiff City | 2023–24 | Championship | 35 | 1 | 0 | 0 | 0 | 0 | — | | 35 | 1 |
| Cardiff City | 2024–25 | Championship | 21 | 0 | 2 | 0 | 0 | 0 | — | | 23 | 0 |
| Cardiff City | Total | | 384 | 32 | 12 | 1 | 11 | 1 | 2 | 0 | 409 | 34 |
| Yeovil Town (loan) | 2013–14 | Championship | 37 | 3 | 1 | 0 | 0 | 0 | — | | 38 | 3 |
| Plymouth Argyle | 2025–26 | League One | 10 | 1 | 0 | 0 | 0 | 0 | 1 (Note: Appearances in EFL Trophy) | 0 | 11 | 1 |
| Career totals | | | 431 | 36 | 13 | 1 | 11 | 1 | 3 | 0 | 458 | 38 |

== Honours ==
Cardiff City

- EFL Championship runner-up: 2017–18

Individual

- Cardiff City Young Player of the Year: 2014–15
