= Lee Peltier =

British footballer (born 1986)

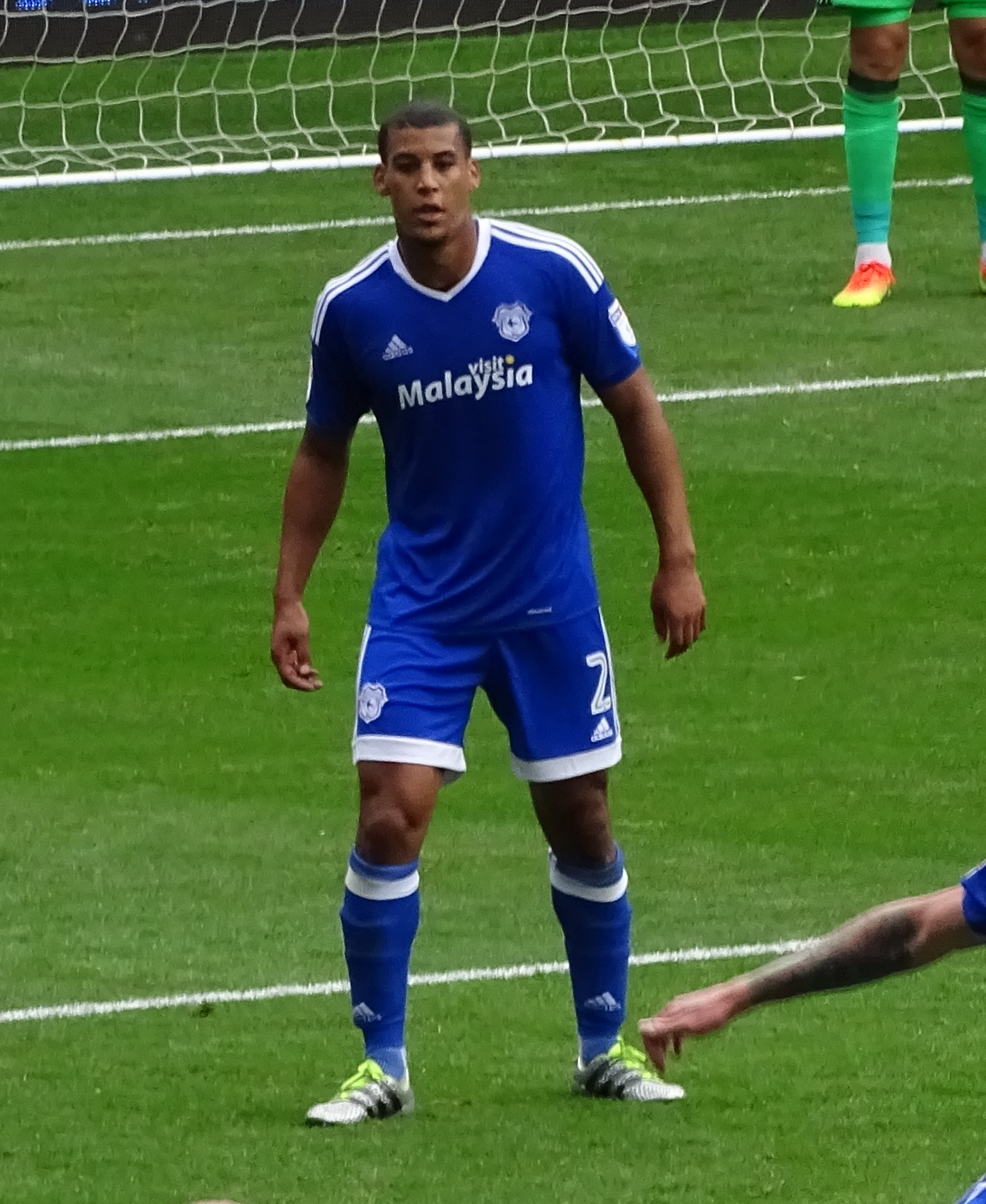
- Peltier playing for Cardiff City in 2016

Personal information
- Full name: Lee Anthony Peltier
- Date of birth: 11 December 1986 (age 39)
- Place of birth: Toxteth, Liverpool, England
- Height: 5 ft 10 in (1.78 m)
- Positions: Right-back; centre-back

Youth career
- 1997–2004: Liverpool

Senior career*
Years	Team	Apps	(Gls)
2004–2008	Liverpool	0	(0)
2007	→ Hull City (loan)	7	(0)
2007	→ Yeovil Town (loan)	19	(0)
2008–2009	Yeovil Town	50	(1)
2009–2011	Huddersfield Town	80	(1)
2011–2012	Leicester City	40	(2)
2012–2014	Leeds United	66	(1)
2014	→ Nottingham Forest (loan)	7	(0)
2014–2015	Huddersfield Town	11	(0)
2015–2020	Cardiff City	159	(0)
2020–2021	West Bromwich Albion	4	(0)
2021–2022	Middlesbrough	21	(0)
2022–2024	Rotherham United	61	(3)
Total		525	(8)

International career
2004	England U18	3	(0)

Managerial career
- 2022: Rotherham United (co-caretaker)
- * Club domestic league appearances and goals

Lee Anthony Peltier (born 11 December 1986) is an English former professional footballer who played as a defender. While he played in positions in both defence and midfield, he was primarily deployed as a right-back or centre-back.

He started his career with his hometown club Liverpool, making his professional debut as a teenager in 2006. After loan spells with Hull City and Yeovil Town he signed for the latter on a permanent basis in 2008. In 2009, he joined Huddersfield Town, where he made over 100 appearances and reached the 2011 Football League One play-off final, before signing for Leicester City. A year later, he moved to Leeds United, where he was appointed club captain on arrival. He fell out of favour in his second season at the club and, after a brief loan spell with Nottingham Forest, he rejoined Huddersfield Town. In 2015, he signed for Cardiff City, where he made 163 appearances and helped the club win promotion to the Premier League after finishing as Championship runners-up during the 2017–18 season.

He is also a former England under-18 international, winning three caps in 2004.

== Early life ==
Born in Toxteth, Liverpool, Peltier attended St. Patrick's Roman Catholic Primary School and Campion High School in his hometown. Peltier first attended football matches at Tranmere Rovers and later Liverpool after joining the club's academy.

== Club career ==
=== Liverpool ===
Peltier joined the Liverpool Academy in 1997 at the age of ten and signed his first professional contract with the club in 2004. Initially playing as a centre-back, he converted to right-back and also featured as a midfielder for the club's youth sides before settling into a full-back role after being promoted to the senior side. In August 2006 he was named in the first-team squad, as an unused substitute for a UEFA Champions League qualifier against Maccabi Haifa. He made his professional debut in a League Cup tie against Reading on 25 October 2006. Two months later, he made his Champions League debut for Liverpool against Galatasaray. With Liverpool already guaranteed to progress to the next round, he played the full 90 minutes at right-back as Liverpool lost 3–2.

On 16 March 2007, Peltier was subject to an emergency loan cover agreement, and subsequently joined Championship side Hull City until the end of the season in order to gain first team experience. He made his debut in a 4–0 victory against Southend United and went on to make seven appearances for the club in the final two months of the 2006–07 season.

=== Yeovil Town ===
In order to gain further first team opportunities, manager Rafael Benítez loaned Peltier to League One club Yeovil Town on 31 July 2007 until 31 December. Peltier agreed to join the club following encouragement from his mother. Eleven days later, he made his debut in a 1–0 defeat against Huddersfield Town. Although a right-back, Peltier played as a midfielder during an FA Cup match against Torquay United in November, but switched back to his original position for the club's following fixture against Gillingham a week later. He made 21 appearances in all competitions during his loan spell without scoring.

On 21 January 2008, he joined Norwich City on trial, featuring in a reserve team fixture against Colchester United, but was not offered a contract by manager Glenn Roeder. On 31 January 2008, he returned to Yeovil on a permanent basis for a minor fee, signing a three-year contract. He ended the season having made 38 appearances in all competitions, including his original loan spell, and won the club's Young Player of the Year award.

In his second season with Yeovil, Peltier made 39 appearances in all competitions, scoring his only goal for the club in a 3–2 victory over Swindon Town on 20 December 2008. His performances attracted attention from several clubs and Yeovil assistant manager Nathan Jones confirmed that the club would not "stand in his way [...] if the price was right." Despite this, Peltier admitted to suffering from homesickness having moved away from Liverpool for the first time in his career, commenting "I was quite happy with my football but [...] I struggled a bit and got quite homesick."

=== Huddersfield Town ===
==== 2009–10 season ====
On 30 June 2009, he joined fellow League One side Huddersfield Town on a three-year contract for an undisclosed fee. Peltier had previously impressed manager Lee Clark during his brief trial spell with Norwich, where Clark was serving as assistant manager. He made his debut in a 2–2 draw against Southend United at Roots Hall on 8 August 2009. He was switched from right-back to left-back for Huddersfield's game against Millwall due to the usual left-back Dean Heffernan suffering from a dead leg. He was Huddersfield's first choice left-back keeping the position for the remainder of the regular season. Peltier helped the side to reach the play-offs in League One playing at left-back for the first leg at home to Millwall, but was forced to return to his usual position of right-back for the second leg at the New Den due to an injury to Tom Clarke in the first leg of the play-off semi final.

Peltier was voted the Players' Player of the Season, in his first season with Huddersfield, after making a total of 50 appearances in all competitions as Huddersfield finished sixth in the regular season before losing 2–0 to Millwall in the Play-Off semi-final second leg on 18 May 2010. In July 2010, Peltier was linked with a £3 million pound move to Queens Park Rangers managed by Neil Warnock. However, in August 2010, he signed a new contract at Huddersfield to extending his deal until 2014.

==== 2010–11 season ====
Peltier remained first choice full back the following season. He received the first red card of his senior career during a 5–1 defeat to Premier League side Everton in the first round of the League Cup, being shown a second yellow after conceding a penalty. On 16 November 2010, he scored his first goal for Huddersfield in their FA Cup first round replay against Cambridge United at the Galpharm Stadium, where Huddersfield were trailing before winning 2–1 with two goals in extra time. His first league goal for Town came in their 3–1 win against Milton Keynes Dons at Stadium MK on 22 April 2011.

He made 53 appearances for the club during the season, helping the side reach the League One play-offs. During the first leg, he suffered a hamstring injury during a 1–1 draw with AFC Bournemouth but overcame fitness doubts play in the second leg, scoring his third goal of the season in a 3–3 draw as Huddersfield reached the final via a penalty shootout. In his last game for the club, Peltier failed to gain promotion at Huddersfield after losing 3–0 to Peterborough United in the 2011 League One play-off final.

=== Leicester City ===
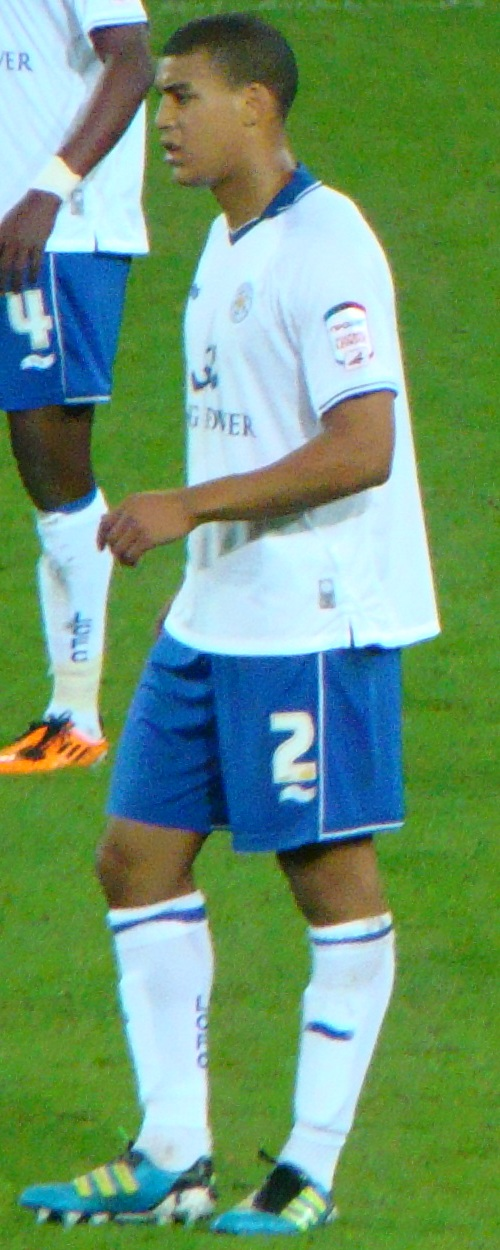
Peltier playing for Leicester City during the 2010–11 season, during which he made 47 appearances

Within hours of Huddersfield's League One playoff defeat, the club received enquiries for several players including Peltier. On 22 June 2011, he signed for Championship side Leicester City, becoming Sven-Göran Eriksson's first signing of the summer after agreeing a three-year deal at the King Power Stadium. He had been recommended to Eriksson by his assistant Derek Fazackerley who had previously worked with Peltier at Huddersfield where Fazackerley had worked as Lee Clark's assistant. The initial fee was reported to be around £750,000 as part of a package worth over £1 million. On 6 August 2011, Peltier scored only goal on his league debut in a 1–0 victory over Coventry City, in the opening game of Leicester's 2011–12 season. However, the club struggled for form at the start of the season which lead to Eriksson's dismissal at the end of October having spent over £10 million on new signings. Over the course of the season Peltier made 40 league appearances, scoring twice, and was the club's first choice right-back, ahead of John Pantsil. The club finished the season in ninth place under Eriksson's successor Nigel Pearson.

In July 2012, after the club signed Belgian right-back Ritchie De Laet, Leicester announced that Peltier was not part of Pearson's long-term planning. Former Leicester player Steve Walsh commented his belief that "his better performances came under Sven and I don't think Nigel saw the best of him", leading to him being made available for a transfer. Despite this, Walsh claimed that Peltier would be a "good signing for any club in this league." Having been made available, Peltier chose to return home from a pre-season training camp in Austria, and this triggered transfer interest from his former club Huddersfield Town and Leeds United. Both clubs were reported to have bid around £600,000 but both were rejected by Leicester City who had set an asking price of £850,000. Leeds later agreed a fee with Leicester for the purchase of Peltier on 3 August.

=== Leeds United ===
Peltier joined Leeds United on 4 August 2012, and signed a three-year contract with the club. He became the club's tenth signing of the summer, with manager Neil Warnock making his signing a priority after missing out on his original target Joel Ward. Peltier made his competitive debut for Leeds playing at centre-back in the first game of the season against Shrewsbury Town in the League Cup on 11 August. Peltier was announced as the new Leeds United captain on 18 August, replacing the departed captain Robert Snodgrass. Peltier made his league debut for Leeds in their 1–0 victory against Wolverhampton Wanderers. He became an established first team player in his first season, making 41 league appearances, under managers Neil Warnock, Neil Redfearn and Brian McDermott primarily as a centre-back partnering Tom Lees. Toward the end of the season, he reverted to his usual position at right-back.

Despite captaining Leeds during 2013–14 pre-season, and for the opening two games of the season, Peltier was replaced in the role by teammate Rodolph Austin who returned to the side against Leicester City on 11 August 2013. Peltier publicly supported Austin following the announcement, commenting "It was the gaffer's choice to go with Rudy and I respect that." Peltier scored his first Leeds goal in a 1–1 draw against Blackpool on 26 December 2013 with a looping header.

After falling out of favour under McDermott, on 24 March 2014, Leeds announced that Peltier had signed for Nottingham Forest on loan, however Forest owner Fawaz Al-Hasawi announced the same day that the deal hadn't been completed, resulting in confusion over which club Peltier was contracted to. On 27 March 2014, Peltier completed his loan move to Nottingham Forest, only hours after their sacking of Billy Davies as manager. His former Leeds manager Neil Warnock was expected to be announced as Davies' replacement and Peltier had been lined up as the club's first signing under the new manager. However, Warnock's appointment collapsed when he was unable to agree personal terms with the club's hierarchy. Peltier attempted to back out of the move after being informed that Warnock was not going to be appointed and had hoped to join Bolton Wanderers instead, who submitted a late bid to sign him. However, the transfer had already been processed and Peltier eventually completed his move to Forest without Warnock. He was favoured in a central midfield position for Forest under caretaker manager Gary Brazil, making his debut in a 1–1 draw with Ipswich Town on 29 March. With Forest appointing Stuart Pearce as the new manager, Peltier returned to Leeds. On his return he stated that he was unsure what his future would hold at Leeds. He made seven appearances for Forest without scoring during his loan spell. He later commented that "I didn't realise how much I wasn't enjoying my football until I joined them (Forest)", believing that instability over Leeds' ownership under Massimo Cellino had directly affected the player's performances. This included a two-month spell where players were left unpaid.

=== Return to Huddersfield Town ===
On 23 June 2014, Peltier left Leeds United, after reaching a mutual agreement with the club to cancel the last year of his contract. Despite interest from Forest, Bolton Wanderers and Blackburn Rovers, on the same day, Peltier rejoined former club Huddersfield Town on a three-year deal. He took the number 37 shirt which he wore during his loan spell at Nottingham Forest at the end of the previous season. On 7 August, he was named as the new club captain by manager Mark Robins, replacing Peter Clarke, who left at the end of the previous season. He made his second debut for the Terriers in their 4–0 defeat by Bournemouth on 9 August. However, following the dismissal of Robins, Peltier fell out of favour under new manager Chris Powell who preferred Tommy Smith. On 16 October, he was relieved of his duties as captain by Powell, being replaced by new signing Mark Hudson. He made only four further appearances under Powell, ending his second spell with Huddersfield having made 12 appearances in all competitions.

=== Cardiff City ===
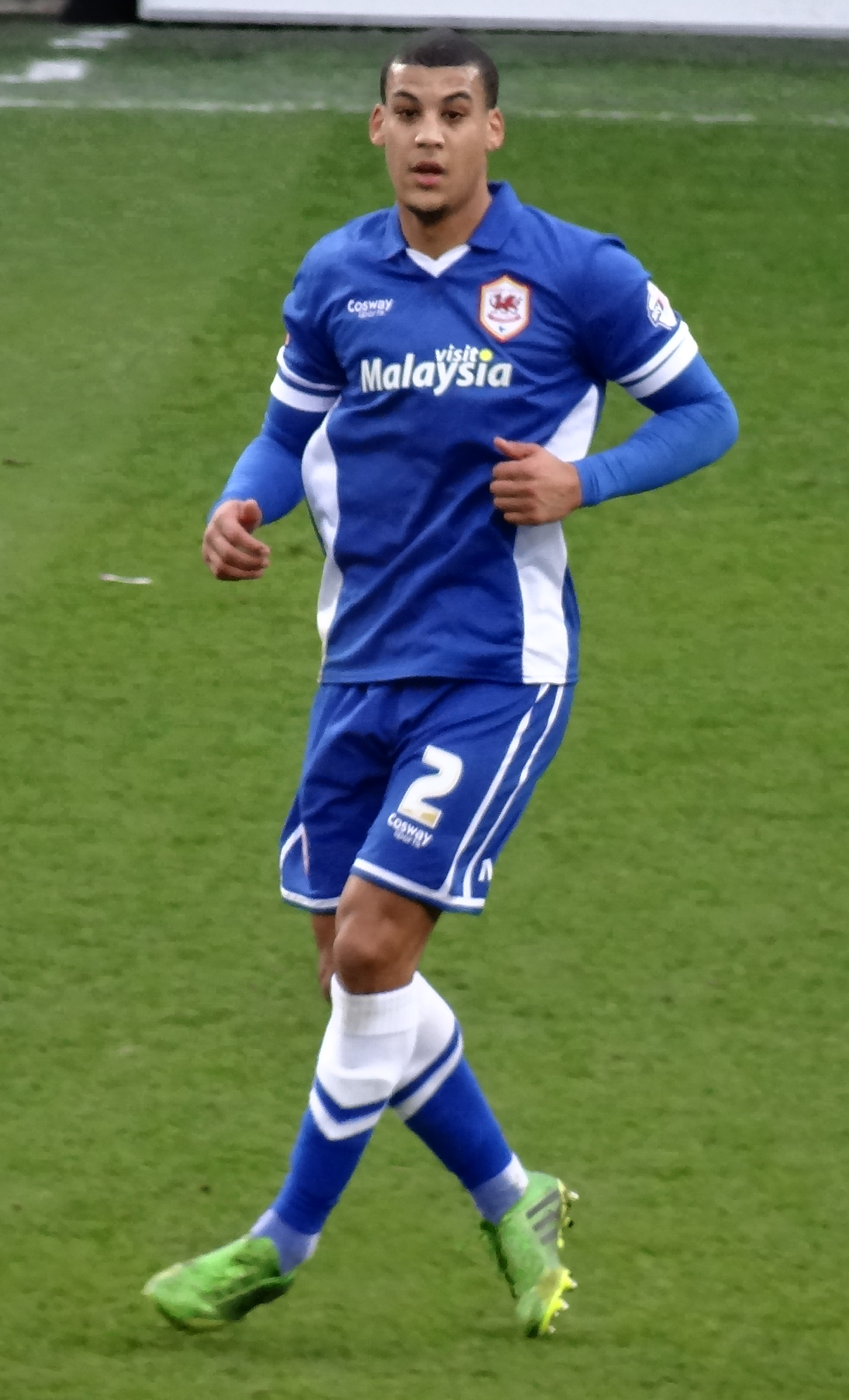
Peltier playing for Cardiff City during the 2014–15 season, during which he made 15 appearances

On 24 January 2015, Peltier signed for Cardiff City on a deal until the summer of 2018, reuniting with his former Yeovil manager Russell Slade. Signed as a replacement for John Brayford, he made his debut for the club, a week later in a 2–0 loss to Derby County, and went on to help Cardiff push away from a relegation battle and finished mid-table. The following season, Peltier became an ever-present member of the team which just missed out on a play-off place to Sheffield Wednesday.

The appointment of Paul Trollope in 2016 as Slade's successor threatened to displace Peltier from the side with the new manager favouring more attack minded full-back Jazz Richards. However, Trollope was sacked after three months in charge and was replaced by Peltier's former Leeds manager Neil Warnock. In February 2017, Peltier underwent an operation on his ankle, which resulted in a long-term absence from the first-team squad. He eventually made his return on 17 April, having missed nearly three months, against Nottingham Forest. Despite an injury-ridden season, he made 28 appearances and was rewarded with a two-year contract extension.

Peltier was part of the side that won promotion to the Premier League during the 2017–18 season, making 30 appearances for the club as they finished as Championship runners-up. In the opening match of the following season, he made his Premier League debut in a 2–0 defeat to Bournemouth. He was dropped from the first team following the match with manager Neil Warnock favouring playing centre-back Bruno Ecuele Manga at right-back, not making a league appearance for over a month when he suffered a shoulder injury during a 5–0 defeat to Manchester City on 22 September.

=== West Bromwich Albion ===
On 31 January 2020, Peltier signed for Cardiff's fellow Championship side West Bromwich Albion. However, he did not make any appearances for the Baggies and was released by the end of the extended season. Peltier rejoined the club in September 2020, and made his debut for the club in the EFL Cup against Harrogate. On 29 December 2020, he made his first league start for West Brom in a 5–0 home defeat to Leeds.

On 27 May 2021 it was announced that Peltier would leave West Bromwich Albion following the conclusion of his contract, thus ending an 18-month spell at the club.

=== Middlesbrough ===
On 2 July 2021, Peltier joined Middlesbrough on a one-year contract. Peltier left the club at the end of the 2021–22 season upon the expiration of his contract.

=== Rotherham United ===
On 28 July 2022, Peltier joined Rotherham United on a one-year contract.

Following the departure of Paul Warne as Rotherham United's manager in September 2022, Peltier was installed as caretaker manager along with Richard Wood as the club searched for a permanent option. Peltier was in the technical area and Wood played as the duo oversaw a 2–0 home loss to Wigan Athletic, this was the only game overseen by the duo before the appointment of Exeter City's Matt Taylor.

He scored his first goal for the South Yorkshire club in a 2-1 defeat to Reading F.C. - his first netting in almost a decade.

== International career ==
Peltier is a former youth international player having represented his native England at international level. He was capped at under-18 level three times during his time as a player at hometown club Liverpool but has not been capped at a higher level than under-18s to date.

In 2012, Peltier was approached by the Antigua and Barbuda Football Association to represent the Benna Boys at international level.

== Style of play ==
Though mainly a right-back, Peltier also plays in the centre-back position. He has said that right-back is his favourite position and has described himself as "a hard working defensive type of player who likes to tackle and pass the ball. [He gets] about the pitch quite well and keep it simple." He does not move up the flanks and shoot crosses; instead he only plays as a defender. Scott Johnson from WalesOnline wrote that he "does not fit the modern stereotype of what we now expect from a full-back, as he is not particularly swashbuckling or flashy."

== Personal life ==
In March 2009, Peltier was shopping with fellow footballer Victor Anichebe in Knutsford when the pair were stopped by police officers after being accused of theft. During the incident, Peltier was handcuffed by officers and Anichebe's crutch was confiscated. The pair were not arrested over the claim and Anichebe received a public apology from the assistant chief constable of the Cheshire Constabulary over the claims.

== Career statistics ==
Appearances and goals by club, season and competition
Club	Season	League			FA Cup		League Cup		Europe		Other		Total	
Club	Season	Division	Apps	Goals	Apps	Goals	Apps	Goals	Apps	Goals	Apps	Goals	Apps	Goals
Liverpool	2006–07	Premier League	0	0	0	0	3	0	1 (Note: Appearance in UEFA Champions League)	0	—		4	0
Hull City (loan)	2006–07	Championship	7	0	0	0	0	0	—		—		7	0
Yeovil Town	2007–08 (Note: Peltier made 23 appearances on loan for Yeovil before joining permanently on 31 January 2008)	League One	19	0	1	0	1	0	—		2 (Note: Appearances in Football League Trophy)	0	23	0
Yeovil Town	2007–08	League One	15	0	0	0	0	0	—		0	0	15	0
Yeovil Town	2008–09	League One	35	1	2	0	2	0	—		0	0	39	1
Yeovil Town	Total		69	1	3	0	3	0	—		2	0	77	1
Huddersfield Town	2009–10	League One	42	0	3	0	2	0	—		3 (Note: Two appearances in Football League One play-offs, one appearance in Football League Trophy)	0	50	0
Huddersfield Town	2010–11	League One	38	1	5	1	2	0	—		8 (Note: Three appearances and one goal in Football League One play-offs, five appearances in Football League Trophy)	1	53	3
Huddersfield Town	Total		80	1	8	1	4	0	—		11	1	103	3
Leicester City	2011–12	Championship	40	2	5	0	2	0	—		—		47	2
Leeds United	2012–13	Championship	41	0	3	0	4	0	—		—		48	0
Leeds United	2013–14	Championship	25	1	1	0	1	0	—		—		27	1
Leeds United	Total		66	1	4	0	5	0	—		—		75	1
Nottingham Forest (loan)	2013–14	Championship	7	0	0	0	0	0	—		—		7	0
Huddersfield Town	2014–15	Championship	11	0	0	0	1	0	—		—		12	0
Cardiff City	2014–15	Championship	15	0	0	0	0	0	—		—		15	0
Cardiff City	2015–16	Championship	41	0	0	0	2	0	—		—		43	0
Cardiff City	2016–17	Championship	28	0	0	0	0	0	—		—		28	0
Cardiff City	2017–18	Championship	30	0	0	0	0	0	—		—		30	0
Cardiff City	2018–19	Premier League	20	0	1	0	1	0	—		—		22	0
Cardiff City	2019–20	Championship	25	0	0	0	0	0	—		—		25	0
Cardiff City	Total		159	0	1	0	3	0	—		—		163	0
West Bromwich Albion	2019–20	Championship	0	0	0	0	0	0	—		—		0	0
West Bromwich Albion	2020–21	Premier League	4	0	1	0	2	0	—		—		7	0
West Bromwich Albion	Total		4	0	1	0	2	0	—		—		7	0
Middlesbrough	2021–22	Championship	21	0	4	0	1	0	—		—		26	0
Rotherham United	2022–23	Championship	34	1	0	0	2	0	—		—		36	1
Rotherham United	2023–24	Championship	27	2	1	0	0	0	—		—		28	2
Rotherham United	Total		61	3	1	0	2	0	—		—		64	3
Career total			525	8	27	1	26	0	1	0	13	1	592	10

== Honours ==
Cardiff City

- EFL Championship runner-up: 2017–18

Individual

- Yeovil Town Young Player of the Year: 2007–08
- Huddersfield Town Players' Player of the season: 2009–10
