= 2018–19 Cardiff City F.C. season =

Welsh football club season

Cardiff City
2018–19 season
- Owner: Vincent Tan
- Chairman: Mehmet Dalman
- Manager: Neil Warnock
- Stadium: Cardiff City Stadium
- Premier League: 18th (relegated)
- FA Cup: Third round (knocked out by Gillingham)
- EFL Cup: Second round (knocked out by Norwich City)
- Top goalscorer: League: Victor Camarasa; Bobby Reid (5 each); All: Victor Camarasa; Bobby Reid (5 each)
- Highest home attendance: 33,082 (vs. Liverpool, 21 April 2019)
- Lowest home attendance: 6,953 (vs. Norwich City, 28 August 2018)
- Average home league attendance: 31,229
- Biggest win: 4–2 (vs. Fulham, 20 October 2018)
- Biggest defeat: 0–5 (vs. Manchester City, 22 September 2018)
Home colours	Away colours	Third colours

The 2018–19 season was Cardiff City's 120th season in their existence and their second in the Premier League. Cardiff were promoted to the top tier of English football league system for the first time since 2013 during the 2017–18 season. Along with competing in the Premier League, the club also participated in the FA Cup and EFL Cup. The season covered the period from 1 July 2018 to 30 June 2019.

On 21 January, a Piper PA-46 Malibu light aircraft transporting Cardiff's recently signed player Emiliano Sala was crashed off Alderney, in the Channel Islands. The aircraft had been travelling from Nantes, France, to Cardiff. The wreckage of the aircraft was found thirteen days later. He was confirmed dead on 7 February. Two days before the tragedy, Sala was presented as a Cardiff player but had not decided on his shirt number at that time. Cardiff and Nantes are in dispute over the payment of the transfer fee for Sala.

== Kit ==
Supplier: adidas
Sponsor(s): Visit Malaysia

Home	Home alt.	Away	Away alt. 1	Away alt. 2	Third	Third alt.

Last updated: 13 April 2019.

== First-team squad ==
No.	Name	Pos.	Nat.	Place of Birth	Age	Caps	Goals	Signed from	Date signed	Fee	Ends
Goalkeepers
1	Neil Etheridge	GK	(Philippines) (England)	London	29	85	0	Walsall	1 July 2017	Free	2021
12	Alex Smithies	GK	(England)	Huddersfield	29	2	0	Queens Park Rangers	1 July 2018	£4,000,000	2022
28	Brian Murphy	GK	(Republic of Ireland)	Waterford	36	10	0	Portsmouth	2 September 2016	Free	2019
Defenders
2	Lee Peltier	FB/CB	(England)	Liverpool	33	139	0	Huddersfield Town	24 January 2015	Nominal	2020
3	Joe Bennett	LB	(England)	Rochdale	29	98	4	Aston Villa	27 August 2016	Free	2021
4	Sean Morrison	CB	(England)	Plymouth	28	196	21	Reading	15 August 2014	£3,180,000	2022
5	Bruno Ecuele Manga	CB/RB	(Gabon)	Libreville	30	161	7	Lorient	1 September 2014	£5,360,000	2020
6	Jazz Richards	FB/DM	(Wales)	Swansea	28	44	0	Fulham	19 July 2016	Swap Deal	2020
13	Callum Paterson	RB/CM	(Scotland) (England)	London	24	64	14	Heart of Midlothian	1 July 2017	£400,000	2022
18	Greg Cunningham	LB	(Republic of Ireland)	Galway	28	8	0	Preston North End	1 July 2018	£4,000,000	2021
22	Sol Bamba	CB	(Ivory Coast) (France)	Ivry-sur-Seine	34	101	10	Free agent	11 October 2016	Free	2020
Midfielders
7	Harry Arter	CM	(Republic of Ireland) (England)	Sidcup	29	25	0	Bournemouth	9 August 2018	Loan	2019
8	Joe Ralls	CM/LM	(England)	Aldershot	26	208	18	Academy	30 September 2011	Trainee	2022
11	Josh Murphy	LW	(England)	Wembley	24	30	3	Norwich City	12 June 2018	£11,000,000	2022
15	Leandro Bacuna	CM/RB	(Curaçao) (Netherlands)	Groningen	27	11	0	Reading	31 January 2019	£4,000,000	2023
17	Aron Gunnarsson	CM/DM	(Iceland)	Akureyri	29	285	25	Coventry City	8 July 2011	£350,000	2019
19	Nathaniel Mendez-Laing	RW/LW	(England)	Birmingham	27	62	11	Rochdale	1 July 2017	Free	2021
21	Víctor Camarasa	CM	(Spain)	Meliana	25	33	5	Real Betis	9 August 2018	Loan	2019
23	Kadeem Harris	LW	(England)	Westminster	26	80	7	Wycombe Wanderers	30 January 2012	£150,000	2019
33	Junior Hoilett	LW/RW	(Canada)	Brampton	29	115	16	Free agent	10 October 2016	Free	2021
Forwards
9	Danny Ward	CF/LW	(England)	Bradford	28	36	5	Rotherham United	1 July 2017	£1,600,000	2020
10	Kenneth Zohore	CF	(Denmark)	Copenhagen	25	101	24	KV Kortrijk	6 July 2016	£300,000	2020
14	Bobby Decordova-Reid	CF/AM	(England)	Bristol	26	29	5	Bristol City	1 July 2018	£10,000,000	2022
29	Oumar Niasse	CF	(Senegal)	Ouakam	29	13	0	Everton	18 January 2019	Loan	2019
32	Rhys Healey	CF	(England)	Manchester	24	15	1	Connah's Quay Nomads	28 January 2013	£25,000	2020
Out on loan
24	Gary Madine	CF	(England)	Gateshead	28	19	0	Bolton Wanderers	31 January 2018	£5,000,000	2021
30	Omar Bogle	CF	(England)	Sandwell	25	12	3	Wigan Athletic	17 August 2017	£700,000	2020
31	Mark Harris	AM/CF	(Wales)	Swansea	20	2	0	Academy	8 January 2017	Trainee	2019
—	Lee Tomlin	AM/WG	(England)	Leicester	30	16	1	Bristol City	13 July 2017	Undisclosed	2020
Players omitted from 25 man squad
16	Matthew Connolly	CB/RB	(England)	Barnet	31	165	7	Queens Park Rangers	22 August 2012	£500,000	2020
20	Loïc Damour	CM/DM	(France)	Chantilly	28	35	0	Bourg-Péronnas	6 July 2017	Free	2019
—	Stuart O'Keefe	CM	(England)	Eye	28	45	2	Crystal Palace	28 January 2015	£910,000	2019

Appearances and goals for the club and contracts are up to date as of 13 May 2019.

=== Statistics ===
As of 13 May 2019

No.	Pos	Nat	Player	Total		Premier League		FA Cup		League Cup	
No.	Pos	Nat	Player	Apps	Goals	Apps	Goals	Apps	Goals	Apps	Goals
1	GK	(Philippines) PHI	Neil Etheridge	38	0	38+0	0	0+0	0	0+0	0
2	DF	(England) ENG	Lee Peltier	22	0	17+3	0	1+0	0	1+0	0
3	DF	(England) ENG	Joe Bennett	31	0	30+0	0	1+0	0	0+0	0
4	DF	(England) ENG	Sean Morrison	34	1	33+0	1	1+0	0	0+0	0
5	DF	(Gabon) GAB	Bruno Ecuele Manga	40	1	37+1	0	1+0	0	1+0	1
6	DF	(Wales) WAL	Jazz Richards	5	0	0+4	0	0+0	0	1+0	0
7	MF	(Republic of Ireland) IRL	Harry Arter	25	0	24+1	0	0+0	0	0+0	0
8	MF	(England) ENG	Joe Ralls	29	0	22+6	0	1+0	0	0+0	0
9	FW	(England) ENG	Danny Ward	16	1	4+10	1	0+1	0	0+1	0
10	FW	(Denmark) DEN	Kenneth Zohore	20	1	7+12	1	0+0	0	0+1	0
11	MF	(England) ENG	Josh Murphy	30	3	22+7	3	0+1	0	0+0	0
12	GK	(England) ENG	Alex Smithies	2	0	0+0	0	1+0	0	1+0	0
13	DF	(Scotland) SCO	Callum Paterson	29	4	21+6	4	1+0	0	0+1	0
14	FW	(England) ENG	Bobby Decordova-Reid	29	5	16+11	5	1+0	0	1+0	0
15	MF	(Curaçao) CUW	Leandro Bacuna	11	0	4+7	0	0+0	0	0+0	0
16	DF	(England) ENG	Matthew Connolly	1	0	0+0	0	0+0	0	1+0	0
17	MF	(Iceland) ISL	Aron Gunnarsson	27	1	26+1	1	0+0	0	0+0	0
18	DF	(Republic of Ireland) IRL	Greg Cunningham	8	0	7+0	0	0+0	0	1+0	0
19	MF	(England) ENG	Nathaniel Mendez-Laing	21	4	11+9	4	1+0	0	0+0	0
20	MF	(France) FRA	Loïc Damour	4	0	0+2	0	1+0	0	1+0	0
21	MF	(Spain) ESP	Víctor Camarasa	33	5	31+1	5	0+0	0	1+0	0
22	DF	(Ivory Coast) CIV	Sol Bamba	28	4	28+0	4	0+0	0	0+0	0
23	MF	(England) ENG	Kadeem Harris	16	1	3+11	1	1+0	0	1+0	0
29	FW	(Senegal) SEN	Oumar Niasse	13	0	12+1	0	0+0	0	0+0	0
32	FW	(England) ENG	Rhys Healey	3	0	0+3	0	0+0	0	0+0	0
33	MF	(Canada) CAN	Junior Hoilett	33	3	24+8	3	0+1	0	0+0	0
Player(s) out on loan:
24	FW	(England) ENG	Gary Madine	6	0	0+5	0	0+0	0	1+0	0

==== Goals record ====
As of 13 May 2019

Rank	No.	Nat.	Po.	Name	Premier League	FA Cup	League Cup	Total
1	14	(England)	CF	Bobby Decordova-Reid	5	0	0	5
1	21	(Spain)	CM	Víctor Camarasa	5	0	0	5
3	13	(Scotland)	RB	Callum Paterson	4	0	0	4
3	19	(England)	RW	Nathaniel Mendez-Laing	4	0	0	4
3	22	(Ivory Coast)	CB	Sol Bamba	4	0	0	4
6	11	(England)	RW	Josh Murphy	3	0	0	3
6	33	(Canada)	LW	Junior Hoilett	3	0	0	3
8	4	(England)	CB	Sean Morrison	1	0	0	1
8	5	(Gabon)	CB	Bruno Ecuele Manga	0	0	1	1
8	9	(England)	CF	Danny Ward	1	0	0	1
8	10	(Denmark)	CF	Kenneth Zohore	1	0	0	1
8	17	(Iceland)	CM	Aron Gunnarsson	1	0	0	1
8	23	(England)	LW	Kadeem Harris	1	0	0	1
Own Goals					1	0	0	1
Total					34	0	1	35

==== Disciplinary record ====
As of 13 May 2019

Rank	No.	Nat.	Po.	Name	Premier League			FA Cup			League Cup			Total		
Rank	No.	Nat.	Po.	Name	Yellow card	(yellow card) (yellow-red card)	Red card	Yellow card	(yellow card) (yellow-red card)	Red card	Yellow card	(yellow card) (yellow-red card)	Red card	Yellow card	(yellow card) (yellow-red card)	Red card
1	7	(Republic of Ireland)	CM	Harry Arter	10	0	0	0	0	0	0	0	0	10	0	0
2	22	(Ivory Coast)	CB	Sol Bamba	7	0	0	0	0	0	0	0	0	7	0	0
3	4	(England)	CB	Sean Morrison	6	0	0	0	0	0	0	0	0	6	0	0
3	21	(Spain)	CM	Víctor Camarasa	6	0	0	0	0	0	0	0	0	6	0	0
5	3	(England)	LB	Joe Bennett	5	0	0	0	0	0	0	0	0	5	0	0
5	8	(England)	CM	Joe Ralls	4	0	1	0	0	0	0	0	0	4	0	1
7	2	(England)	RB	Lee Peltier	4	0	0	0	0	0	0	0	0	4	0	0
7	13	(Scotland)	RB	Callum Paterson	4	0	0	0	0	0	0	0	0	4	0	0
7	17	(Iceland)	CM	Aron Gunnarsson	4	0	0	0	0	0	0	0	0	4	0	0
7	33	(Canada)	LW	Junior Hoilett	4	0	0	0	0	0	0	0	0	4	0	0
11	18	(Republic of Ireland)	LB	Greg Cunningham	3	0	0	0	0	0	0	0	0	3	0	0
12	1	(Philippines)	GK	Neil Etheridge	2	0	0	0	0	0	0	0	0	2	0	0
12	11	(England)	LW	Josh Murphy	2	0	0	0	0	0	0	0	0	2	0	0
12	15	(Curaçao)	CM	Leandro Bacuna	2	0	0	0	0	0	0	0	0	2	0	0
15	6	(Wales)	RB	Jazz Richards	0	0	0	0	0	0	1	0	0	1	0	0
15	10	(Denmark)	CF	Kenneth Zohore	1	0	0	0	0	0	0	0	0	1	0	0
15	20	(France)	CM	Loïc Damour	0	0	0	0	0	0	1	0	0	1	0	0
15	23	(England)	LM	Kadeem Harris	1	0	0	0	0	0	0	0	0	1	0	0
Total					65	0	1	0	0	0	2	0	0	67	0	1

==== Suspensions ====
Player	Date received	Offence	Length of suspension	
Joe Ralls	6 October 2018	(red card) vs Tottenham Hotspur	3 games	Fulham (H), Liverpool (A), Leicester City (H)
Harry Arter	3 November 2018	5x (yellow card)	1 game	Brighton & Hove Albion (H)

Last updated: 4 November 2018.
Source: Football Association

=== Contracts ===
Date	Position	Nationality	Name	Status	Contract Length	Expiry Date	Ref.
3 July 2018	LB	(England)	Joe Bennett	Signed	3 years	June 2021	
6 July 2018	CB	(England)	Matthew Connolly	Signed	2 years	June 2020	
6 July 2018	RW	(England)	Nathaniel Mendez-Laing	Signed	3 years	June 2021	
6 July 2018	CB	(England)	Sean Morrison	Signed	4 years	June 2022	
6 July 2018	GK	(Republic of Ireland)	Brian Murphy	Signed	1 year	June 2019	
6 July 2018	RB	(Scotland) (England)	Callum Paterson	Signed	4 years	June 2022	
6 July 2018	RB	(England)	Lee Peltier	Signed	2 years	June 2020	
6 July 2018	CM	(England)	Joe Ralls	Signed	4 years	June 2022	
9 July 2018	CM	(Iceland)	Aron Gunnarsson	Signed	1 year	June 2019	

== Transfers ==
=== In ===
Date	Position	Nationality	Name	From	Fee	Ref.
1 July 2018	LB	(Republic of Ireland)	Greg Cunningham	Preston North End	Undisclosed (Note: Fee reported to be around £4,000,000)	
1 July 2018	LW	(England)	Josh Murphy	Norwich City	Undisclosed (Note: Fee reported to be around £11,000,000)	
1 July 2018	CF	(England)	Bobby Reid	Bristol City	Undisclosed (Note: Fee reported to be £10,000,000)	
1 July 2018	GK	(England)	Alex Smithies	Queens Park Rangers	Undisclosed (Note: Sky Sports reported that £3,000,000 will be paid upfront and a further £500,000 if Cardiff stay in the Premier League for one season.)	
19 January 2019	CF	(Argentina)	Emiliano Sala	(France) Nantes	£15,000,000	
31 January 2019	CM	(Curaçao)	Leandro Bacuna	Reading	£4,000,000	
1 February 2019	CF	(Wales)	Danny Wiliams	Haverfordwest County	Undisclosed	

- Spent: ▼ – Undisclosed (~ £32,000,000)

=== Out ===
Date	Position	Nationality	Name	To	Fee	Ref.
1 July 2018	CB	(Wales)	Rhys Abbruzzese	Unattached	Released	
1 July 2018	CF	(Benin)	Frédéric Gounongbe	Unattached	Released	
1 July 2018	CB	(England)	Greg Halford	(Scotland) Aberdeen	Released	
1 July 2018	RW	(Scotland)	Matthew Kennedy	(Scotland) St Johnstone	Released	
1 July 2018	CF	(Nigeria)	Ogo Obi	Unattached	Released	
1 July 2018	FW	(Wales)	Keiron Proctor	Unattached	Released	
1 July 2018	GK	(England)	Ben Wilson	Bradford City	Released	
1 July 2018	LB	(England)	Connor Young	Unattached	Released	
8 August 2018	GK	(Northern Ireland)	Lee Camp	Birmingham City	Free transfer	
10 January 2019	LW	(Republic of Ireland)	Anthony Pilkington	Wigan Athletic	Free transfer	
1 February 2019	CF	(England)	Ibrahim Meite	Crawley Town	Free transfer	

=== Loan in ===
Start date	Position	Nationality	Name	From	End date	Ref.
9 August 2018	CM	(Republic of Ireland)	Harry Arter	Bournemouth	31 May 2019	
9 August 2018	CM	(Spain)	Víctor Camarasa	(Spain) Real Betis	31 May 2019	
18 January 2019	CF	(Senegal)	Oumar Niasse	Everton	31 May 2019	
4 February 2019	CM	(Republic of Ireland)	Aaron Bolger	(Republic of Ireland) Shamrock Rovers	31 May 2019	

=== Loan out ===
Start date	Position	Nationality	Name	To	End date	Ref.
2 August 2018	AM	(Wales)	Mark Harris	Newport County	4 January 2019	
7 August 2018	CF	(England)	Omar Bogle	Birmingham City	29 January 2019	
24 August 2018	CF	(England)	Rhys Healey	Milton Keynes Dons	4 January 2019	
24 August 2018	CM	(England)	Stuart O'Keefe	Plymouth Argyle	4 January 2019	
4 January 2019	CB	(Scotland)	Paul McKay	Morecambe	31 May 2019	
7 January 2019	CF	(England)	Gary Madine	Sheffield United	31 May 2019	
8 January 2019	SS	(England)	Lee Tomlin	Peterborough United	31 May 2019	
11 January 2019	CB	(Wales)	Jack Bodenham	The New Saints	30 June 2019	
23 January 2019	LW	(Wales)	Mark Harris	Port Vale	30 June 2019	
24 January 2019	CB	(England)	Ciaron Brown	(Scotland) Livingston	30 June 2019	
28 January 2019	CF	(England)	Omar Bogle	Portsmouth	30 June 2019	
31 January 2019	CF	(Scotland)	Jack McKay	Chesterfield	30 June 2019	
31 January 2019	CF	(Wales)	James Waite	Hereford	30 June 2019	

== Competitions ==
=== Friendlies ===
13 July 2018 Friendly	Taff's Well	0–3	Cardiff City	Taff's Well
19:45 BST		Report	Healey 21', 47'; McLean 89'	Stadium: Rhiw Dda'r

16 July 2018 Friendly	Tavistock AFC	0–6	Cardiff City	Tavistock
19:00 BST		Report	Hoilett 1'; Ralls 9'; Madine 23', 29'; Reid 25'; Ward 70'	Stadium: Langsford Park

18 July 2018 Friendly	Bodmin Town	1–11	Cardiff City	Bodmin
19:00 BST	Gilbert 29'	report	Reid 8'; Mendez-Laing 14'; Harris 17', 25', 46'; Murphy 24', 61'; Ward 38', 43', 57'; Madine 90'	Stadium: Priory Park

20 July 2018 Friendly	Torquay United	1–1	Cardiff City	Torquay
19:00 BST	Keating 57'	Report	Murphy 22'	Stadium: Plainmoor; Referee: Adam Bromley

25 July 2018 Friendly	Rotherham United	2-1	Cardiff City	Rotherham
19:45 BST	Palmer 31'; Smith 78'		Murphy 13'	Stadium: New York Stadium

28 July 2018 Friendly	Burton Albion	1–5	Cardiff City	Burton upon Trent
15:00 BST	Boyce 12'	Report	Hoilett 32'; Zohore 40'; Mendez-Laing 44'; Reid 55'; Paterson 72'	Stadium: Pirelli Stadium

4 August 2018 Friendly	Cardiff City	1–2	Real Betis	Cardiff
17:15 BST	Murphy 4'	Report	Loren 23'; Tello 30'	Stadium: Cardiff City Stadium

=== Premier League ===
==== League table ====
Pos	Team	Pld	W	D	L	GF	GA	GD	Pts	Qualification or relegation
16	Southampton	38	9	12	17	45	65	−20	39	
17	Brighton & Hove Albion	38	9	9	20	35	60	−25	36	
18	Cardiff City (R)	38	10	4	24	34	69	−35	34	Relegation to EFL Championship
19	Fulham (R)	38	7	5	26	34	81	−47	26	Relegation to EFL Championship
20	Huddersfield Town (R)	38	3	7	28	22	76	−54	16	Relegation to EFL Championship

Source: Premier League
Rules for classification: 1) Points; 2) Goal difference; 3) Goals scored; 4) Play-offs (only if needed to decide champion, teams for relegation or teams for UEFA competitions).
(R) Relegated

==== Result summary ====
Overall								Home						Away					
Pld	W	D	L	GF	GA	GD	Pts	W	D	L	GF	GA	GD	W	D	L	GF	GA	GD
38	10	4	24	34	69	−35	34	6	2	11	21	38	−17	4	2	13	13	31	−18

Last updated: 12 May 2019.
Source: Premier League

==== Results by matchday ====
Matchday	1	2	3	4	5	6	7	8	9	10	11	12	13	14	15	16	17	18	19	20	21	22	23	24	25	26	27	28	29	30	31	32	33	34	35	36	37	38
Ground	A	H	A	H	A	H	H	A	H	A	H	H	A	H	A	H	A	H	A	A	H	H	A	A	H	A	H	H	A	H	H	A	A	A	H	A	H	A
Result	L	D	D	L	L	L	L	L	W	L	L	W	L	W	L	W	L	L	D	W	L	D	L	L	W	W	L	L	L	W	L	L	L	W	L	L	L	W
Position	18	15	14	16	16	19	19	20	17	17	18	18	19	16	16	14	16	17	17	16	16	17	18	18	18	15	17	18	18	18	18	18	18	18	18	18	18	18
Points	0	1	2	2	2	2	2	2	5	5	5	8	8	11	11	14	14	14	15	18	18	19	19	19	22	25	25	25	25	28	28	28	28	31	31	31	31	34

Updated to match(es) played on 12 May 2019. Source: 11v11.com
A = Away; H = Home; W = Win; D = Draw; L = Loss

==== Matches ====
On 14 June 2018, the Premier League fixtures for the forthcoming season were announced.

11 August 2018 1	Bournemouth	2–0	Cardiff City	Bournemouth
15:00 BST	Fraser 24'; Daniels (yellow card) 43'; Wilson 90'		Peltier (yellow card) 3'	Stadium: Dean Court; Attendance: 10,353; Referee: Kevin Friend (Leicestershire)

18 August 2018 2	Cardiff City	0–0	Newcastle United	Cardiff
12:30 BST	Camarasa (yellow card) 62'; Arter (yellow card) 80'	Report	Ritchie (yellow card) 3'; Manquillo (yellow card) 30'; Hayden (red card) 66'	Stadium: Cardiff City Stadium; Attendance: 30,720; Referee: Craig Pawson (South Yorkshire)
Note: Live on Sky TV

25 August 2018 3	Huddersfield Town	0–0	Cardiff City	Huddersfield
15:00 BST	Hogg (red card) 63'	Report	Arter (yellow card) 63'	Stadium: John Smith's Stadium; Attendance: 23,787; Referee: Michael Oliver (Northumberland)

2 September 2018 4	Cardiff City	2–3	Arsenal	Cardiff
13:30 BST	Camarasa 45+2', (yellow card) 77'; Ward 70'; Hoilett (yellow card) 71'; Arter (yellow card) 90+3'	Report	Mustafi 12'; Monreal (yellow card) 25'; Bellerín (yellow card) 51'; Guendouzi (yellow card) 58'; Aubameyang 62'; Xhaka (yellow card) 66'; Lacazette 81'	Stadium: Cardiff City Stadium; Attendance: 32,316; Referee: Anthony Taylor (Manchester)
Note: Live on Sky TV

15 September 2018 5	Chelsea	4–1	Cardiff City	London
15:00 BST	Hazard 37', 44', 80' (pen.); Willian 83'	Report	Bamba 16'	Stadium: Stamford Bridge; Attendance: 40,499; Referee: Jonathan Moss (West Riding, Yorkshire)

22 September 2018 6	Cardiff City	0–5	Manchester City	Cardiff
15:00 BST	Ralls (yellow card) 45+1'	Report	Agüero 32'; B. Silva 35'; Gündoğan 44'; Fernandinho (yellow card) 60'; Mahrez 67', 89'	Stadium: Cardiff City Stadium; Attendance: 32,321; Referee: Michael Oliver (Northumberland)

30 September 2018 7	Cardiff City	1–2	Burnley	Cardiff
16:00 BST	Murphy 60'	Report	Guðmundsson 51'; Vokes 70'	Stadium: Cardiff City Stadium; Attendance: 30,411; Referee: Martin Atkinson (West Riding, Yorkshire)
Note: Live on Sky TV

6 October 2018 8	Tottenham Hotspur	1–0	Cardiff City	London
15:00 BST	Dier 8'; D Sánchez (yellow card) 51'; Kane (yellow card) 59'; Alderweireld (yellow card) 68'	Report	Ralls (red card) 58'; Arter (yellow card) 90+5'	Stadium: Wembley; Attendance: 43,268; Referee: Mike Dean (Cheshire)

20 October 2018 9	Cardiff City	4–2	Fulham	Cardiff
15:00 BST	Murphy 15'; Reid 20'; Gunnarsson (yellow card) 33'; Paterson 65'; Morrison (yellow card) 68'; Bamba (yellow card) 78'; Harris 87'	Report	Schurrle 11'; Chambers (yellow card) 19'; Sessegnon 34'; McDonald (yellow card) 36'; Johansen (yellow card) 45+3'	Stadium: Cardiff City Stadium; Attendance: 29,681; Referee: Kevin Friend (Leicestershire)

27 October 2018 10	Liverpool	4–1	Cardiff City	Liverpool
15:00 BST	Salah 10'; Mané 66', 87'; Shaqiri 84'	Report	Paterson 77'	Stadium: Anfield; Attendance: 53,373; Referee: Stuart Attwell (West Midlands)

3 November 2018 11	Cardiff City	0–1	Leicester City	Cardiff
15:00 GMT	Arter (yellow card) 45'; Hoilett (yellow card) 81'	Report	Ricardo Pereira (yellow card) 33'; Gray 55', (yellow card) 55'	Stadium: Cardiff City Stadium; Attendance: 30,877; Referee: Lee Probert (Wiltshire)

10 November 2018 12	Cardiff City	2–1	Brighton & Hove Albion	Cardiff
12:30 GMT	Paterson 28', (yellow card) 35'; Cunningham (yellow card) 85'; Bamba 90'	Report	Dunk 6'; Stephens (red card) 34'; Bissouma (yellow card) 90+5'	Stadium: Cardiff City Stadium; Attendance: 29,402; Referee: Martin Atkinson (West Riding, Yorkshire)
Note: Live on Sky TV

24 November 2018 13	Everton	1–0	Cardiff City	Liverpool
15:00 GMT	Sigurðsson 59'	Report	Etheridge (yellow card) 43'; Camarasa (yellow card) 58'; Harris (yellow card) 63'	Stadium: Goodison Park; Attendance: 39,139; Referee: Paul Tierney (Greater Manchester)

30 November 2018 14	Cardiff City	2–1	Wolverhampton Wanderers	Cardiff
20:00 GMT	Gunnarsson 65'; Paterson (yellow card) 71'; Hoilett 77'	Report	Doherty 18'; Neves (yellow card) 61'; Saïss (yellow card) 66'	Stadium: Cardiff City Stadium; Attendance: 30,213; Referee: Andre Marriner (Birmingham)
Note: Live on Sky TV

4 December 2018 15	West Ham United	3–1	Cardiff City	London
19:45 GMT	Arnautovic (yellow card) 36'; Pérez 49', 54'; Antonio 61'	Report	Ralls (yellow card) 40'; Bamba (yellow card) 65'; Murphy 90+5'	Stadium: London Stadium; Attendance: 56,811; Referee: Graham Scott (Oxfordshire)

8 December 2018 16	Cardiff City	1–0	Southampton	Cardiff
15:00 GMT	Morrison (yellow card) 19'; Bennett (yellow card) 66'; Paterson 74'	Report	Valery (yellow card) 28'; Romeu (yellow card) 74'	Stadium: Cardiff City Stadium; Attendance: 30,067; Referee: Jonathan Moss (Yorkshire)

15 December 2018 17	Watford	3–2	Cardiff City	Watford
15:00 GMT	Deulofeu 16'; Holebas 52'; Quina 68'	Report	Hoilett 80'; Reid 82'	Stadium: Vicarage Road; Attendance: 20,032; Referee: Andrew Madley (Yorkshire)

22 December 2018 18	Cardiff City	1–5	Manchester United	Cardiff
17:30 GMT	Camarasa 38' (pen.); Gunnarsson (yellow card) 58'; Cunningham (yellow card) 79'	Report	Rashford 3'; Herrera 29'; Shaw (yellow card) 35'; Martial 41'; Lingard 57' (pen.), 90'	Stadium: Cardiff City Stadium; Attendance: 33,028; Referee: Michael Oliver (Northumberland)
Note: Live on BT Sport

26 December 2018 19	Crystal Palace	0–0	Cardiff City	London
15:00 GMT		Report	Bamba (yellow card) 31'; Hoilett (yellow card) 45+1'; Camarasa (yellow card) 77'	Stadium: Selhurst Park; Attendance: 25,206; Referee: Lee Probert (Wiltshire)

29 December 2018 20	Leicester City	0–1	Cardiff City	Leicester
15:00 GMT		Report	Etheridge (yellow card) 53'; Camarasa 90+2'; Morrison (yellow card) 90+4'	Stadium: King Power Stadium; Attendance: 32,047; Referee: Simon Hooper (Wiltshire)

1 January 2019 21	Cardiff City	0–3	Tottenham Hotspur	Cardiff
17:30 GMT	Bamba (yellow card) 53'	Report	Kane 3'; Eriksen 12'; Son 26'	Stadium: Cardiff City Stadium; Attendance: 32,485; Referee: Kevin Friend (Leicestershire)
Note: Live on Sky TV

12 January 2019 22	Cardiff City	0–0	Huddersfield Town	Cardiff
15:00 GMT	Arter (yellow card) 33'; Hoilett (yellow card) 71'; Bennett (yellow card) 82'	Report	Schindler (yellow card) 10'	Stadium: Cardiff City Stadium; Attendance: 30,725; Referee: Lee Mason (Lancashire)

19 January 2019 23	Newcastle United	3–0	Cardiff City	Newcastle upon Tyne
15:00 GMT	Schär 24', 63'; Pérez 90+3'	Report	Camarasa (yellow card) 46'	Stadium: St James' Park; Attendance: 49,864; Referee: Stuart Attwell (West Midlands)

29 January 2019 24	Arsenal	2–1	Cardiff City	London
19:45 GMT	Monreal (yellow card) 29'; Guendouzi (yellow card) 45+2'; Aubameyang 66' (pen.); Lacazette (yellow card) 81', (goal) 83'	Report	Paterson (yellow card) 36'; Arter (yellow card) 63'; Ralls (yellow card) 90'; Mendez-Laing 90+3'	Stadium: Emirates Stadium; Attendance: 59,333; Referee: Mike Dean (Cheshire)

2 February 2019 25	Cardiff City	2–0	Bournemouth	Cardiff
17:30 GMT	Reid 5' (pen.), 46'; Bamba (yellow card) 50'	Report	Clyne (yellow card) 50'; Smith (yellow card) 75'	Stadium: Cardiff City Stadium; Attendance: 31,939; Referee: Jonathan Moss (Yorkshire)
Note: Live on BT Sport TV

9 February 2019 26	Southampton	1–2	Cardiff City	Southampton
15:00 GMT	Ward-Prowse (yellow card) 45+1'; Redmond (yellow card) 89'; Stephens 90+1'; Reomeu (yellow card) 90+6'	Report	Gunnarsson (yellow card) 61'; Bamba 69', (yellow card) 70'; Zohore 90+3', (yellow card) 90+4'	Stadium: St Mary's Stadium; Referee: Martin Atkinson (West Riding County)

22 February 2019 27	Cardiff City	1–5	Watford	Cardiff
19:45 GMT	Bamba 82'; Paterson (yellow card) 85'	Report	Deulofeu 18', 61', 63'; Capoue (yellow card) 30'; Pereyra (yellow card) 55'; Deeney 73', 90+1'	Stadium: Cardiff City Stadium; Attendance: 30,387; Referee: Simon Hooper (Wiltshire)
Note: Moved to Friday night to avoid clash with Wales v England Rugby International

26 February 2019 28	Cardiff City	0–3	Everton	Cardiff
19:45 GMT	Bacuna (yellow card) 7'; Morrison (yellow card) 14'; Murphy (yellow card) 81'	Report	Sigurðsson 41', 66'; Digne (yellow card) 50'; Calvert-Lewin 90+3'	Stadium: Cardiff City Stadium; Attendance: 31,849; Referee: Kevin Friend (Leicestershire)

2 March 2019 29	Wolverhampton Wanderers	2–0	Cardiff City	Wolverhampton
15:00 GMT	Jota 16'; Jiménez 18'; Bennett (yellow card) 34'	Report	Bamba (yellow card) 45'; Peltier (yellow card) 62'	Stadium: Molineux; Attendance: 31,309; Referee: Andre Marriner (Birmingham)

9 March 2019 30	Cardiff City	2–0	West Ham United	Cardiff
15:00 GMT	Hoilett 4'; Arter (yellow card) 29'; Camarasa 52'; Morrison (yellow card) 86'	Report	Hernández (yellow card) 37'	Stadium: Cardiff City Stadium; Attendance: 32,458; Referee: Graham Scott (Oxfordshire)

31 March 2019 31	Cardiff City	1–2	Chelsea	Cardiff
14:05 BST	Camarasa 46'; Arter (yellow card) 54'; Gunnarsson (yellow card) 86'	Report	Jorginho (yellow card) 26'; Azpilicueta (yellow card) 61', (goal) 84'; Rüdiger (yellow card) 87'; Loftus-Cheek 90+1'	Stadium: Cardiff City Stadium; Attendance: 32,657; Referee: Craig Pawson (Sheffield)
Note: Live on Sky TV

3 April 2019 32	Manchester City	2–0	Cardiff City	Manchester
19:45 BST	De Bruyne 6'; Sané 44'	Report	Bennett (yellow card) 8'; Peltier (yellow card) 34'; Ralls (yellow card) 53'	Stadium: City of Manchester Stadium; Attendance: 53,559; Referee: Jonathan Moss (Yorkshire)
Note: Live on Sky TV

13 April 2019 33	Burnley	2–0	Cardiff City	Burnley
15:00 BST	Wood 31', 90+2'; Tarkowski (yellow card) 42'; Barnes (yellow card) 45+2'	Report	Bennett (yellow card) 45+1'; Peltier (yellow card) 50'; Arter (yellow card) 50'; Camarasa (yellow card) 82'	Stadium: Turf Moor; Attendance: 21,480; Referee: Mike Dean (Cheshire)

16 April 2019 34	Brighton & Hove Albion	0–2	Cardiff City	Brighton
19:45 BST		Report	Mendez-Laing 22'; Morrison 50'; Bennett (yellow card) 79'	Stadium: Falmer Stadium; Attendance: 30,226; Referee: Andre Marriner (Birmingham)

21 April 2019 35	Cardiff City	0–2	Liverpool	Cardiff
16:00 BST	Gunnarsson (yellow card) 80'	Report	Wijnaldum 57'; Milner 81' (pen.), (yellow card) 90+1'	Stadium: Cardiff City Stadium; Attendance: 33,082; Referee: Martin Atkinson (West Riding County)
Note: Live on Sky TV

27 April 2019 36	Fulham	1–0	Cardiff City	Fulham
15:00 BST	Babel 79'	Report		Stadium: Craven Cottage; Attendance: 23,822; Referee: Chris Kavanagh

4 May 2019 37	Cardiff City	2–3	Crystal Palace	Cardiff
17:30 BST	Kelly 31' (o.g.); Reid 90'	Report	Zaha 28'; Batshuayi 39'; Townsend 70'	Stadium: Cardiff City Stadium; Attendance: 32,133; Referee: Michael Oliver (Northumberland)
Note: Live on BT Sport

12 May 2019 38	Manchester United	0–2	Cardiff City	Manchester
15:00 BST	Pereira (yellow card) 44'; Pogba (yellow card) 61'; Lingard (yellow card) 71'	Report	Mendez-Laing 23' (pen.), 54'; Bacuna (yellow card) 28'; Murphy (yellow card) 61'; Morrison (yellow card) 90+1'	Stadium: Old Trafford; Attendance: 74,457; Referee: Jonathan Moss (Yorkshire)

=== FA Cup ===
The third round draw was made live on BBC by Ruud Gullit and Paul Ince from Stamford Bridge on 3 December 2018.

5 January 2019 Third round	Gillingham	1–0	Cardiff City	Gillingham
15:00 GMT	Zakuani (yellow card) 49'; List 81'; Parker (yellow card) 90+3'	Report		Stadium: Priestfield Stadium; Attendance: 7,090; Referee: Tim Robinson

=== EFL Cup ===
The second round draw was made from the Stadium of Light on 16 August.

28 August 2018 Second round	Cardiff City	1–3	Norwich City	Cardiff
19:45 BST	Richards (yellow card) 40'; Damour (yellow card) 73'; Manga 77'	Report	Srbeny 26', 64'; Stiepermann (yellow card) 29'; Aarons 69', (yellow card) 79'	Stadium: Cardiff City Stadium; Attendance: 6,953; Referee: Andy Madley

== Summary ==
Games played	40 (38 Premier League, 1 FA Cup, 1 League Cup)
Games won	10 (10 Premier League, 0 FA Cup, 0 League Cup)
Games drawn	4 (4 Premier League, 0 FA Cup, 0 League Cup)
Games lost	26 (24 Premier League, 1 FA Cup, 1 League Cup)
Goals scored	35 (34 Premier League, 0 FA Cup, 1 League Cup)
Goals conceded	73 (70 Premier League, 1 FA Cup, 3 League Cup)
Goal difference	-39
Clean sheets	10 (10 Premier League, 0 FA Cup, 0 League Cup)
Yellow cards	67 (65 Premier League, 0 FA Cup, 2 League Cup)
Red cards	1 (1 Premier League, 0 FA Cup, 0 League Cup)
Worst Discipline	(Republic of Ireland) Harry Arter (10 (yellow card) , 0 (yellow card) (yellow-red card) , 0 (red card) )
Best result	4–2 vs Fulham (20 Oct 18); 2–0 vs Bournemouth (2 Feb 19); 2–0 vs West Ham United (9 Mar 19); 2–0 vs Brighton & Hove Albion (16 Mar 19); 2–0 vs Manchester United (12 May 19)
Worst result	0–5 vs Manchester City (22 Sep 18)
Most appearances	(Gabon) Bruno Ecuele Manga (40 starts, 0 subs)
Top scorer	(Spain) Victor Camarasa (5) (Jamaica) Bobby Decordova-Reid (5)
Most Cleans Sheets	(Philippines) Neil Etheridge (10)
Points	34

== Club staff ==
=== Backroom staff ===
Position	Name
Manager	(England) Neil Warnock
Assistant manager	(England) Kevin Blackwell
First-team coach	(England) Ronnie Jepson
Goalkeeper coach	(Wales) Andy Dibble
Assistant coach	(Wales) James Rowberry
Head of medical services	(England) Paul Godfrey
Club doctor	(Wales) Dr. Len Nokes
First-team physiotherapist	(Wales) James Rowland
Head of Fitness & Conditioning	(England) Lee Southernwood
Senior Strength & Conditioning	(Wales) Mike Beere
Sports scientist	(Wales) Ben Parry
Head scout	(England) Glyn Chamberlain
First Team Analyst	(Wales) Jack Radusin
Player Liaison Officer	(Wales) Callum Davies
Kit and Equipment Manager	(Wales) Paul Carter

=== Board of directors ===
Position	Name
Chairman	(Cyprus) Mehmet Dalman
General Manager	(Malaysia) Ken Choo
Finance Director	(Wales) Richard Thompson
Non-Executive; Board Members; Football Club	(Wales) Steve Borley (since 2003) (United Kingdom) Marco Caramella (since 2017) (Malaysia) Derek Chee Seng Chin (since 2010) (Malaysia) Veh Ken Choo (since 2016) (Cyprus) Mehmet Dalman (since 2012) (Canada) Ronald Issen (since 2018)
Non-Executive; Board Members; Cardiff City (Holdings)	(Malaysia) Danni Rais (since 2012)
Club Secretary	(England) David Beeby
