= Loïc Damour =

French footballer (born 1991)

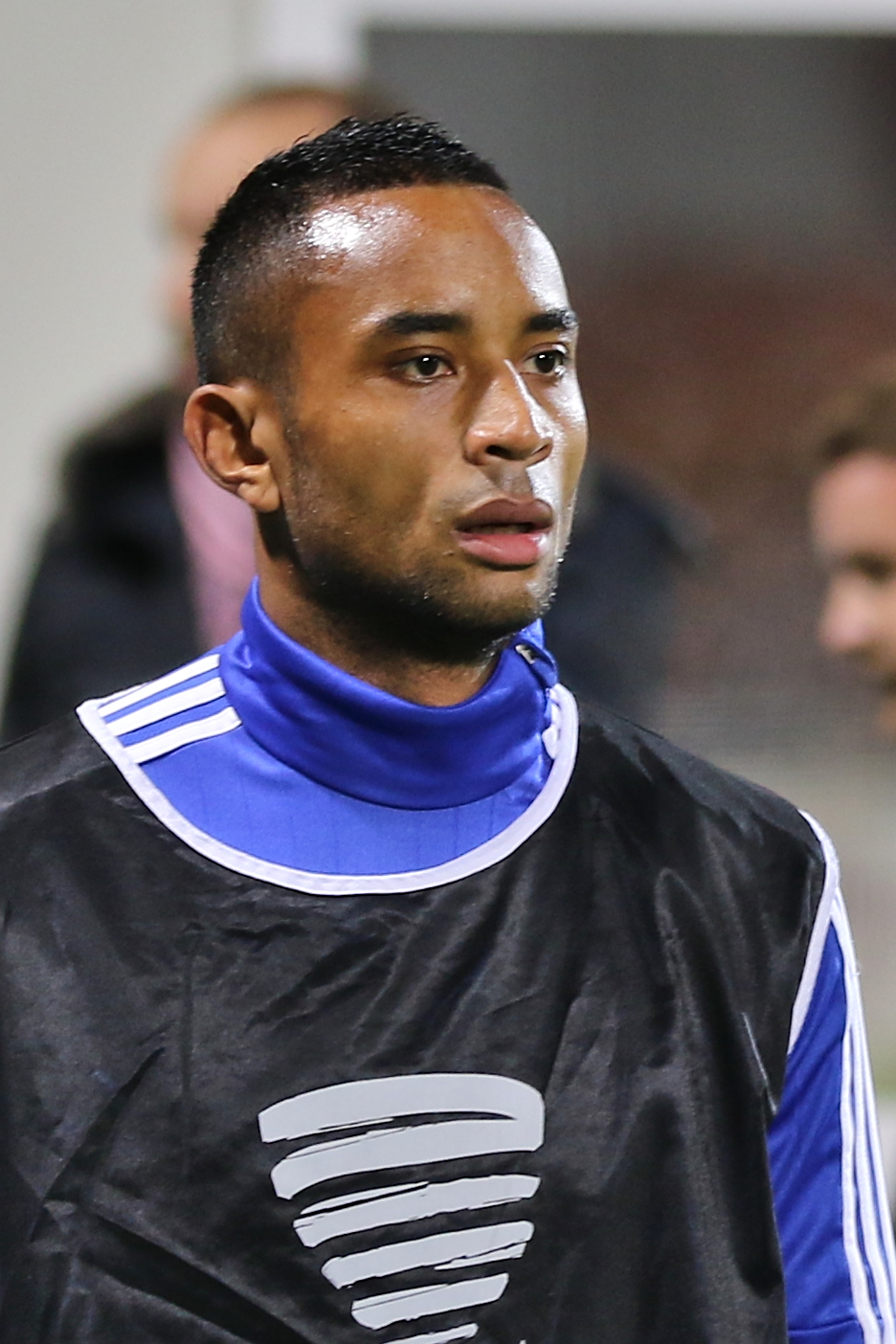
- Damour with Bourg-Péronnas in 2015

Personal information
- Full name: Loïc Damour
- Date of birth: 8 January 1991 (age 35)
- Place of birth: Chantilly, France
- Height: 1.80 m (5 ft 11 in)
- Position: Midfielder

Youth career
- 1998: AS Breuil-le-Vert
- 1998–2000: RC Clermont
- 2000–2004: US Chantilly
- 2004–2007: INF Clairefontaine
- 2007–2008: Strasbourg

Senior career*
Years	Team	Apps	(Gls)
2008–2011	Strasbourg	44	(1)
2011–2013	Boulogne	18	(0)
2013	Brussels	6	(0)
2013–2014	White Star Bruxelles	9	(0)
2014–2015	Fréjus Saint-Raphaël	31	(3)
2015–2017	Bourg-Péronnas	69	(4)
2017–2019	Cardiff City	29	(0)
2019–2022	Heart of Midlothian	18	(0)
2021–2022	→ Le Mans (Loan)	25	(1)
2022–2024	Versailles	27	(1)

International career
2006–2007	France U16	13	(2)
2007–2008	France U17	12	(1)
2008–2009	France U18	5	(0)
2009–2010	France U19	4	(1)
2011	France U20	5	(0)
Medal record
Men's football
Representing France
UEFA European Under-17 Championship
Runner-up	2008 Turkey
- * Club domestic league appearances and goals as of 7 September 2023

Loïc Damour (born 8 January 1991) is a French professional footballer who most recently played as a midfielder for Ligue 3 club Versailles.

A graduate of the Clairefontaine academy, Damour has played for a number of clubs during his career, including Strasbourg, Boulogne, Brussels, White Star Bruxelles, Fréjus Saint-Raphaël, Bourg-en-Bresse Péronnas, Heart of Midlothian and Cardiff City.

== Club career ==
=== Early years ===
Loïc began his career with his local club US Chantilly before moving to the famous Clairefontaine academy in 2004. While training at Clairefontaine, he also attended the prestigious sports club Athletic Club de Boulogne Billencourt, which also trained current French stars Hatem Ben Arfa and Issiar Dia.

=== RC Strasbourg ===
In April 2008 after leaving Clairefontaine, Damour signed his first professional contract, agreeing to a three-year deal with RC Strasbourg. After spending one year in the reserves, he was promoted to the senior squad and was assigned the number 26 shirt. He made his professional football debut for Strasbourg on 4 August 2008 in a Ligue 2 match against Montpellier coming on as a substitute.

On 26 October 2009, Damour signed a contract extension with Strasbourg until the year 2013.

=== Cardiff City ===
On 6 July 2017, following the expiry of his contract with Bourge-Péronnas, Damour signed for EFL Championship side Cardiff City on a free transfer. He made his debut for the club on the opening day of the 2017–18 season during a 1–0 victory over Burton Albion, as a substitute in place of Lee Tomlin.

=== Heart of Midlothian ===
Damour left Cardiff in August 2019 and signed a four-year contract with Scottish Premiership club Hearts.

==== Le Mans (loan) ====
On 3 August 2021, Damour joined Championnat National side Le Mans on a season-long loan.

=== Versailles ===
In June 2022, Damour signed with Versailles in Championnat National.

Damour left Versailles at the end of the 2023–24 season upon the expiration of his contract.

== International career ==
Damour is a France youth international having played for the U-16s, U-17s, and the under-18 team. He also played with the France U-19 and France U-20 squads, until 2011. He was captain of the U-16 squad and was a part of the U-17 squad that finished runners-up at the 2008 UEFA European Under-17 Championship.

== Career statistics ==
As of match played 29 July 2020

Appearances and goals by club, season and competition
Club	Season	League			National Cup		League Cup		Other		Total	
Club	Season	Division	Apps	Goals	Apps	Goals	Apps	Goals	Apps	Goals	Apps	Goals
RC Strasbourg	2008–09	Ligue 2	4	0	0	0	0	0	0	0	4	0
RC Strasbourg	2009–10	Ligue 2	5	0	0	0	1	0	0	0	6	0
RC Strasbourg	2010–11	National	34	1	2	0	1	0	0	0	37	1
RC Strasbourg	Strasbourg total		43	1	2	0	2	0	0	0	47	1
Boulogne	2011–12	Ligue 2	17	0	2	0	0	0	0	0	19	0
Boulogne	2012–13	National	1	0	0	0	0	0	0	0	1	0
Boulogne	Boulogne total		18	0	2	0	0	0	0	0	20	0
RWDM Brussels	2012–13	Belgian Second Division	6	0	0	0	—		0	0	6	0
White Star Bruxelles	2013–14	Belgian Second Division	9	0	2	0	—		0	0	11	0
Fréjus Saint-Raphaël	2014–15	National	31	3	1	0	0	0	0	0	32	3
Bourg-en-Bresse Péronnas	2015–16	Ligue 2	33	2	4	0	4	0	0	0	41	2
Bourg-en-Bresse Péronnas	2016–17	Ligue 2	36	2	0	0	1	0	0	0	37	2
Bourg-en-Bresse Péronnas	Bourg-en-Bresse total		69	4	4	0	5	0	0	0	78	4
Cardiff City	2017–18	Championship	27	0	3	0	2	0	0	0	32	0
Cardiff City	2018–19	Premier League	2	0	1	0	1	0	0	0	4	0
Cardiff City	Cardiff City total		29	0	4	0	3	0	0	0	36	0
Heart of Midlothian	2019–20	Scottish Premiership	18	0	1	0	2	0	0	0	21	0
Heart of Midlothian	2020–21	Scottish Championship	0	0	0	0	0	0	0	0	0	0
Heart of Midlothian	Heart of Midlothian total		18	0	1	0	2	0	0	0	21	0
Career total			223	8	16	0	12	0	0	0	251	8

== Honours ==
Cardiff City

- EFL Championship runner-up: 2017–18
