= Bruno Ecuele Manga =

Gabonese football manager (born 1988)

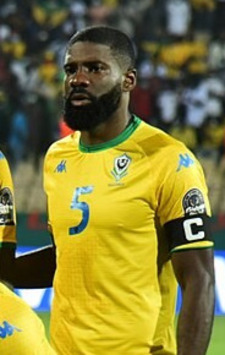
- Manga in 2022

Personal information
- Full name: Bruno Ecuele Manga
- Date of birth: 16 July 1988 (age 38)
- Place of birth: Libreville, Gabon
- Height: 1.86 m (6 ft 1 in)
- Position: Centre-back

Team information
- Current team: Gabon

Senior career*
Years	Team	Apps	(Gls)
2006	FC 105 Libreville		
2006–2007	Bordeaux B	40	(0)
2007–2008	Bordeaux	0	(0)
2008	→ Rodez (loan)	15	(0)
2008–2010	Angers	58	(5)
2010–2014	Lorient	118	(4)
2014–2019	Cardiff City	150	(5)
2019–2022	Dijon	84	(3)
2023	Belfort	13	(0)
2023–2024	Niort	29	(5)
2024–2026	Paris 13 Atletico	44	(1)

International career
2006–2025	Gabon	118	(9)

Managerial career
- 2026—: Gabon (manager)
- * Club domestic league appearances and goals

Bruno Ecuele Manga (born 16 July 1988) is a Gabonese football manager who is currently the manager of the Gabon national team. He played as a centre-back, and was known for being a tough tackler.

After beginning his career with FC 105 Libreville in his home country, he joined French side Bordeaux in 2006. He played for the club's reserve side and spent time on loan with lower division side Rodez, but made only one appearance for the senior side, before being released in 2008. He subsequently joined Ligue 2 side Angers, making more than 50 appearances in two seasons before joining Lorient in 2010 for a fee of €2.5 million.

He made his Ligue 1 debut with Lorient and went on to make more than 100 appearances in the top tier of French football. He was appointed club captain ahead of the 2012–13 season and remained in the role until 2014, when he signed for Championship side Cardiff City for €5 million. He spent four seasons in the division before helping the club win promotion to the Premier League after finishing as Championship runners-up in the 2017–18 season.

Manga made his international debut for Gabon in 2006, and with over 100 caps, is Gabon's most-capped player, representing the side at four Africa Cup of Nations tournaments.

== Club career ==
=== Early career ===
Ecuele Manga began his career in his homeland with FC 105 Libreville, before being recommended to French Ligue 1 side Girondins de Bordeaux by Alain Giresse, who was manager of the Gabon national team. After being involved in the club's preseason fixtures under manager Laurent Blanc, Ecuele Manga made his competitive debut for Bordeaux, making his first start, in the Matchday Six, in a 3–2 win over Panionios. However, he never played a league game for the club, and spent time on loan at Rodez.

At the end of his contract, he was signed on a free transfer by Angers on a three-year deal, lasting until 2011. There, Ecuele Manga was joined by two Gabonese compatriots, Arsène Do Marcolino and Fabrice Do Marcolino. Ecuele Manga made his Angers' debut in the opening game of the season, in a 0–0 draw against Bastia. He scored his first goal for the club on 24 October 2008, in a 2–0 win over Tours. On 3 March 2009, Ecuele Manga signed a new contract with the club, extending his deal until 2012. This came after a series impressive display at Angers caught attracted attention from several other clubs. In his first season at Angers, Ecuele Manga made thirty appearances, scoring twice.

Ahead of the 2009–10 season, Ecuele Manga was on the verge of joining Rennes in a deal worth €4 million. However, the move never happened. Ecuele Manga was absent at the start of the season, and his first appearance came in a 0–0 draw against Strasbourg on 2 October. In his second game of the season against Strasbourg on 5 March 2010, Ecuele Manga scored the first brace of his career, in a 2–1 win. In his second season at Angers, Ecuele Manga made twenty-eight appearances, scoring three times. While at Angers, Ecuele Manga became an integral part of their defence set-up, establishing himself in the first team. He later explained his departure from Angers.

=== Lorient ===
During the 2010 summer transfer window, he joined FC Lorient for €2.5 million, and became a first team regular in Ligue 1 as a replacement for Laurent Koscielny who left Lorient for Arsenal. Ecuele Manga made his Lorient debut in the opening game of the season, making his first start, in a 2–2 draw against Auxerre. Ecuele Manga was soon sidelined after injuring his hamstring in training, an injury that caused him to miss two matches in late-November. His season was further disrupted in mid-February when he injured his thigh. After making his return in a 3–3 draw against Arles-Avignon on 12 March 2011, Ecuele Manga scored his first Lorient goal, in a 3–1 loss against Montpellier on 11 May 2011. In his first season at Lorient, Ecuele Manga scored once in thirty-one appearances for the club.

Ecuele Manga's second season with the club started when he played as center-back in the first-twelve matches (including scoring his first goal of the season against Brest on 29 October 2011) until he was absent through injury and suspension. While on the sidelines, Ecuele Manga signed a new contract with the club, extending his deal until 2015. He made his return in early-December, in a 4–0 loss against Montpellier. On 17 March 2012, Ecuele Manga scored his second goal of the season, in a 2–1 win over Brest. Though scoring twice in thirty-two appearances in his second season, Ecuele Manga's agent announced that Ecuele Manga will stay at the club following a re–ignited interests from clubs around Europe.

Ecuele Manga acquired French nationality by naturalization in July 2012.

At the start of the 2012–13 season, Ecuele Manga was appointed as the new captain of Lorient after replacing Fabien Audard. However, in the opening game of the season in a 2–2 draw against Paris Saint-Germain, Ecuele Manga injured his ligament, and he had to come off, as second half had just started and then it was announced that Ecuele Manga would be out for six months. After a six months absence, he made his return on 26 January 2013, in a 2–1 loss against Nancy. Ecuele Manga then scored his first goal of the season, in the Round of 16 of Coupe de France, in a 3–0 win over Brest. Ecuele Manga's captaincy came into question after Lorient lost 5–0 against Lille on 7 April 2013. In response, he reminded himself to take responsibilities as a captain. With the sideline kept Ecuele Manga for a long time, Ecuele Manga made seventeen appearances and scored once.

In the 2013–14 season, Ecuele Manga continued to remain Lorient captain throughout the season and captained thirty-three matches out of the thirty-five appearances he made. Ecuele Manga scored his first goal for the club on 1 March 2014, in a 1–1 draw against Bastia. Ecuele Manga was absence for three matches, due to a knee injury occurring in late-February and a red card in May, which saw him suspended for one match. During the season, Ecuele Manga "won 119 aerial duels more than any other player".

Having received a red card in his second final game for Lorient, Ecuele Manga was suspended for the opening game of the 2014–15 season for Lorient and after making his return, Ecuele Manga captained once in his three appearances by the end of August. After Monaco announced their interest signing Ecuele Manga, Ecuele Manga hinted leaving Lorient, quoting: "I want to see something else, to have other challenges." With a one-year contract left at Lorient, there is slim chance for Ecuele Manga leave at the end of the transfer window.

=== Cardiff City ===
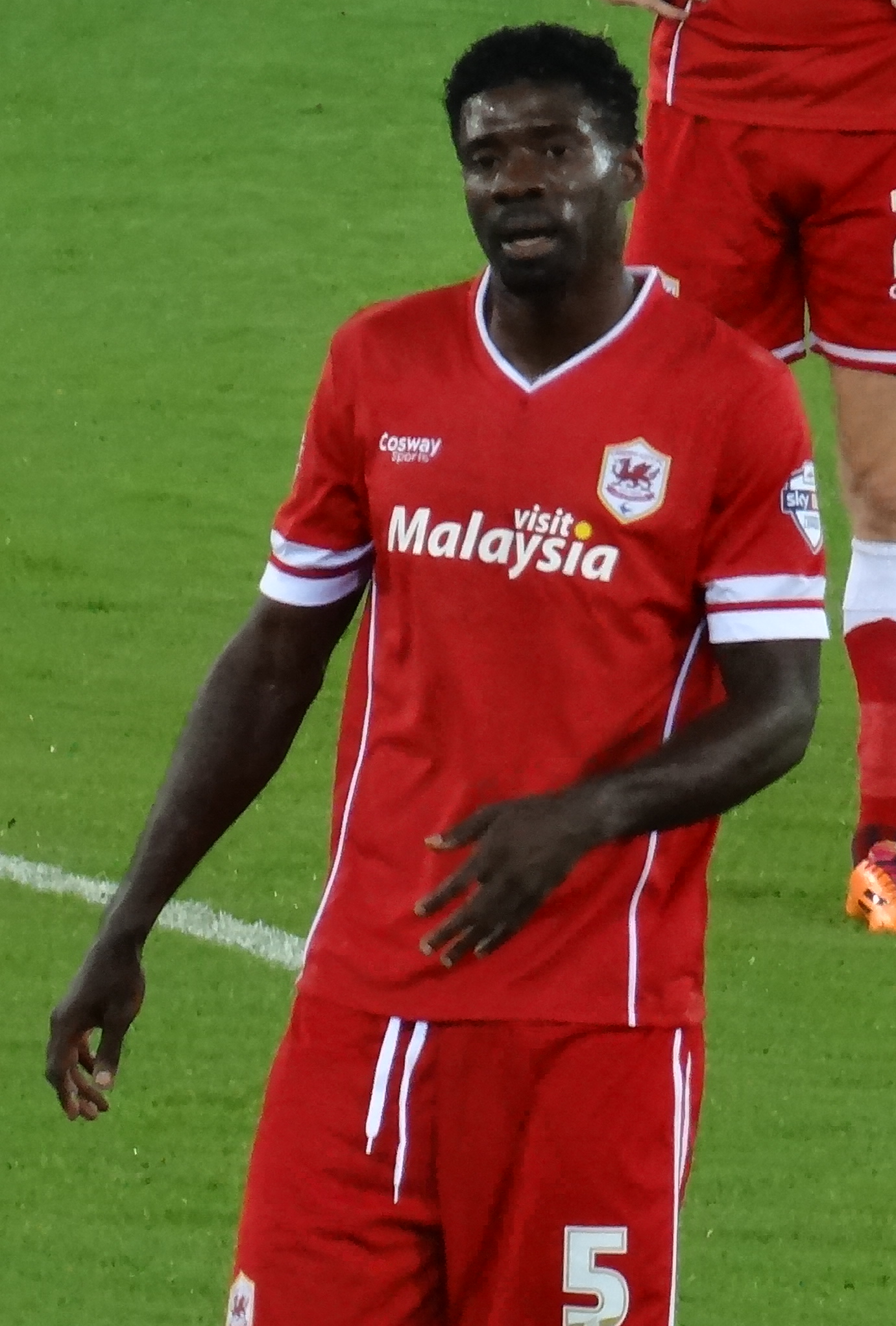
Ecuele Manga playing for Cardiff City in 2014

On 1 September 2014, Bruno Ecuele Manga signed for Welsh club Cardiff City for €5 million, keeping him until 2017.

Ecuele Manga then made his Cardiff City debut, making his first start, in a 1–0 loss against Middlesbrough on 16 September 2014. Ecuele Manga scored his first Cardiff City goal, in a 3–1 win over Leeds United two months later on 1 November 2014. However, Ecuele Manga was on the sideline after injuring his knee during a match against Bolton Wanderers and his international commitment and made his return for his thirteenth start of the season, in a 3–2 loss against Brentford on 20 December 2014.

Ecuele Manga was on the sideline again for his international commitment after being included for the Africa Cup of Nations. Ecuele Manga made his return, on 7 February 2015, in a 1–1 draw against Sheffield Wednesday. Ecuele Manga then scored his second goal of the season, in a 3–1 win over Rotherham United on 3 March 2015 and then his third goal came, a week later on 17 March 2015, in a 1–1 draw against Bournemouth. Ecuele Manga's impressive in his first season led calls for him to be named "Cardiff City's player of the season" by Wales Online.

During the pre-season, Ecuele Manga picked up a knee injury, resulting in him missing out on the start of the season. Making his first appearance in the League Cup win over AFC Wimbledon and then being dropped back to the bench for the league games that followed. Whilst on international duty in September, he picked up a groin injury and was ruled out for two months. Ecuele Manga made his return to the first team coming on as a substitute for the injured, Sean Morrison against Birmingham City.

Despite another injury-ridden season, Ecuele Manga was offered a new contract by manager, Neil Warnock, which was signed on 27 June 2017. He made a total of 43 appearances as Cardiff finished 2nd in the league, to earn promotion to the Premier League. He scored his only goal of the season in a 4–1 win over Mansfield Town in the FA Cup.

Manga scored Cardiff's first goal of 2018–19 season in a 3–1 loss to Norwich City in the Football League Cup.

=== Later career ===
On 19 July 2019, Ecuele Manga completed a move to French side Dijon FCO. He later played for Belfort, Niort and Paris 13 Atletico.

== Managerial Career ==
On 20 August 2026, he was appointed manager of Gabon, with Sébastien Migné being the head coach and Alain Giresse the technical director.

== International career ==
Ecuele Manga was first called up by Gabon in 2006, making his debut in an Africa Cup of Nations qualifying match against Ivory Coast, which Gabon lost 5–0. Gabon failed to qualify for the 2008 Africa Cup of Nations, but did qualify for the 2010 tournament, which Ecuele Manga has described as the highlight of his international career. Gabon went out in the first round, finishing third in their group. In the 2012 Africa Cup of Nations, Ecuele Manga played all four matches as Gabon finished top of their group before being knocked out in the quarter dinals. Ecuele Manga was one of the three permitted over-21 players in Gabon's squad at the 2012 Summer Olympics in London. Gabon were eliminated in the group stage.

In 2018, he was called up to Gabon's squad for the King's Cup tournament hosted in Thailand. Gabon reached the semi-final but then lost to Thailand on penalty shootout; However, they won against United Arab Emirates on the third place play-off.

On 9 September 2025, he earned his 113th international cap in a goalless draw against Ivory Coast during the 2026 World Cup qualification, becoming Gabon's most capped player and breaking the previous record held by Didier Ovono.

In December 2025, Ecuele Manga played in the 2025 Africa Cup of Nations, his sixth AFCON tournament, noting in an interview that at 37 years old he was now playing alongside youngsters like Bryan Meyo who was born the same year Ecuele Manga made his debut from the national team. Ecuele Manga embraced the nickname "Paul Biya" which had been given to him by media and fans in honour of his age and longevity with the national team, comparing him to the nonagenarian leader of Cameroon who had been in power for 43 years.

In early January 2026, Ecuele Manga along with Pierre-Emerick Aubameyang were banned from the national team by Gabon's government, following what the sports minister described as Gabon's "disgraceful performance" at the 2025 African Cup of Nations, where they finished bottom of their group with three defeats. However, the suspension was lifted later that month.

On 19 March 2026, he announced his retirement from Gabon national team on his Facebook page.

== Career statistics ==
=== Club ===
As of 15 May 2026

Appearances and goals by club, season and competition
Club	Season	League			National cup (Note: Includes Coupe de France, FA Cup)		League cup (Note: Includes Coupe de la Ligue, EFL Cup)		Europe		Total	
Club	Season	Division	Apps	Goals	Apps	Goals	Apps	Goals	Apps	Goals	Apps	Goals
Bordeaux	2007–08	Ligue 1	0	0	0	0	0	0	1 (Note: Appearance in UEFA Europa League)	0	1	0
Angers	2008–09	Ligue 2	30	2	0	0	0	0	–		30	2
Angers	2009–10	Ligue 2	28	3	0	0	0	0	–		28	3
Angers	Total		58	5	0	0	0	0	–		58	5
Lorient	2010–11	Ligue 1	31	1	3	0	2	0	–		36	1
Lorient	2011–12	Ligue 1	32	2	0	0	2	0	–		34	2
Lorient	2012–13	Ligue 1	17	0	3	1	0	0	–		20	1
Lorient	2013–14	Ligue 1	35	1	1	0	0	0	–		36	1
Lorient	2014–15	Ligue 1	3	0	0	0	0	0	–		3	0
Lorient	Total		118	4	7	1	4	0	–		129	5
Cardiff City	2014–15	Championship	29	3	0	0	0	0	–		29	3
Cardiff City	2015–16	Championship	24	2	1	0	1	0	–		26	2
Cardiff City	2016–17	Championship	21	0	0	0	1	0	–		22	0
Cardiff City	2017–18	Championship	38	0	3	1	2	0	–		43	1
Cardiff City	2018–19	Premier League	38	0	1	0	1	1	–		40	1
Cardiff City	Total		150	5	5	1	5	1	–		160	7
Dijon FCO	2019–20	Ligue 1	28	0	2	1	1	0	–		31	1
Dijon FCO	2020–21	Ligue 1	38	2	0	0	—		–		38	2
Dijon FCO	2021–22	Ligue 2	18	1	2	1	—		–		20	2
Dijon FCO	Total		84	3	4	2	1	0	0	0	89	5
ASM Belfort	2022–23	Championnat National 2	13	0	0	0	—		–		13	0
Chamois Niortais	2023–24	Championnat National	29	5	0	0	—		–		29	5
Paris 13 Atletico	2024–25	Championnat National	17	1	0	0	—		–		17	1
Paris 13 Atletico	2025–26	Championnat National	27	0	1	0	—		–		28	0
Paris 13 Atletico	Total		43	1	1	0	—		–		44	1
Career total			496	23	17	4	10	1	1	0	524	28

=== International ===
As of match played 28 December 2025

Appearances and goals by national team and year
National team	Year	Apps	Goals
Gabon	2006	1	0
Gabon	2007	3	1
Gabon	2008	9	1
Gabon	2009	4	1
Gabon	2010	8	0
Gabon	2011	6	1
Gabon	2012	7	0
Gabon	2013	5	2
Gabon	2014	4	0
Gabon	2015	10	1
Gabon	2016	8	1
Gabon	2017	9	0
Gabon	2018	5	0
Gabon	2019	5	0
Gabon	2020	3	1
Gabon	2021	6	0
Gabon	2022	5	0
Gabon	2023	3	0
Gabon	2024	6	0
Gabon	2025	11	0
Total		118	9

Scores and results list Gabon's goal tally first, score column lists each Ecuele Manga goal.

No.	Date	Venue	Opponent	Score	Result	Competition
1	21 August 2007	Stade Dominique Duvauchelle, Créteil, France	Benin	1–2	2–2	Friendly
2	7 September 2008	Seisa Ramabodu Stadium, Bloemfontein, South Africa	Lesotho	1–0	3–0	2010 FIFA World Cup qualification
3	6 June 2009	Stade Omar Bongo, Libreville, Gabon	Togo	1–0	3–0	2010 FIFA World Cup qualification
4	6 September 2011	Stade du Ray, Nice, France	Niger	1–0	1–0	Friendly
5	15 June 2013	Stade de Franceville, Franceville, Gabon	Niger	3–1	4–1	2014 FIFA World Cup qualification
6	14 August 2013	Complexo Desportivo do Real SC, Queluz, Portugal	Cape Verde	1–1	1–1	Friendly
7	25 March 2015	Stade Pierre Brisson, Beauvais, France	Mali	4–3	4–3	Friendly
8	2 September 2016	Khartoum Stadium, Khartoum, Sudan	Sudan	2–1	2–1	Friendly
9	16 November 2020	Independence Stadium, Bakau, Gambia	Gambia	1–2	1–2	2021 Africa Cup of Nations qualification

== Honours ==
Cardiff City

- EFL Championship runner-up: 2017–18

Gabon

- King's Cup third place: 2018

Individual

- Cardiff City Player of the Year: 2014–15

== See also ==
- List of men's footballers with 100 or more international caps
