= 2017–18 Cardiff City F.C. season =

Welsh football club season

Cardiff City F.C.
2017–18 season
- Owner: Vincent Tan
- Chairman: Mehmet Dalman
- Manager: Neil Warnock
- Stadium: Cardiff City Stadium
- Championship: 2nd (promoted)
- FA Cup: Fourth round (vs. Manchester City)
- EFL Cup: Second round (vs. Burton Albion)
- Top goalscorer: League: Callum Paterson (10); All: Junior Hoilett (11)
- Highest home attendance: 32,478 vs Reading, 6 May 2018
- Lowest home attendance: 5,820 vs Burton Albion, 22 August 2017
- Average home league attendance: 20,164
Home colours	Away colours	Third colours

The 2017–18 season was Cardiff City's 119th season in their existence and the 90th in the Football League. Along with competing in the Championship, the club also participated in the FA Cup and League Cup. The season covers the period from 1 July 2017 to 30 June 2018.

== First-team squad ==
No.	Name	Pos.	Nat.	Place of Birth	Age	Apps	Goals	Signed from	Date signed	Fee	Ends
Goalkeepers
25	Neil Etheridge	GK	(Philippines) (England)	London	28	47	0	Walsall	1 July 2017	Free	2021
28	Brian Murphy	GK	(Republic of Ireland)	Waterford	35	10	0	Portsmouth	2 September 2016	Free	2018
	Chris Konopka	GK	(United States)	New Jersey	33	0	0	Free agent	8 March 2018	Free	2018
Defenders
2	Lee Peltier	FB/CB	(England)	Liverpool	32	117	0	Huddersfield Town	24 January 2015	Nominal	2019
3	Joe Bennett	LB	(England)	Rochdale	28	67	4	Aston Villa	27 August 2016	Free	2019
4	Sean Morrison	CB	(England)	Plymouth	27	162	20	Reading	15 August 2014	£3,180,000	2020
5	Bruno Ecuele Manga	CB/RB	(Gabon)	Libreville	29	121	6	Lorient	1 September 2014	£5,360,000	2019
6	Jazz Richards	FB/DM	(Wales)	Swansea	27	39	0	Fulham	19 July 2016	Swap Deal	2019
14	Sol Bamba	CB	(Ivory Coast) (France)	Ivry-sur-Seine	33	73	6	Free agent	11 October 2016	Free	2020
15	Greg Halford	RB/CB/DM	(England)	Chelmsford	33	33	1	Rotherham United	6 January 2017	Nominal	2018
16	Matthew Connolly	CB/RB	(England)	Barnet	30	163	7	Queens Park Rangers	22 August 2012	£500,000	2019
18	Callum Paterson	RB/CM	(Scotland)	London	23	35	10	Heart of Midlothian	1 July 2017	£400,000	2020
32	Armand Traore	LB/CB	(Senegal) (France)	Chatenay-Malabry	28	4	1	Nottingham Forest	1 February 2018	Loan	2018
Midfielders
8	Joe Ralls	CM/LM	(England)	Aldershot	25	179	18	Academy	30 September 2011	Trainee	2020
11	Kadeem Harris	LW	(England)	Westminster	25	64	6	Wycombe Wanderers	30 January 2012	£150,000	2019
12	Liam Feeney	RM/LM	(England)	Hammersmith	32	16	0	Blackburn Rovers	31 August 2017	Loan	2018
13	Anthony Pilkington	LW/CF	(Republic of Ireland) (England)	Blackburn	30	111	23	Norwich City	15 August 2014	£1,060,000	2019
17	Aron Gunnarsson	CM/DM	(Iceland)	Akureyri	30	258	24	Coventry City	8 July 2011	£350,000	2018
19	Nathaniel Mendez-Laing	RW/LW	(England)	Birmingham	26	41	7	Rochdale	1 July 2017	Free	2019
20	Loïc Damour	CM/DM	(France)	Chantilly	27	31	0	Bourg-Péronnas	6 July 2017	Free	2019
21	Craig Bryson	CM	(Scotland)	Rutherglen	31	22	2	Derby County	31 August 2017	Loan	2018
24	Marko Grujić	DM/CM	(Serbia)	Belgrade	22	14	1	Liverpool	17 January 2018	Loan	2018
31	Mark Harris	AM/WG	(Wales)	Swansea	19	2	0	Academy	8 January 2017	Trainee	2019
33	Junior Hoilett	LW/RW	(Canada)	Brampton	28	82	13	Free agent	10 October 2016	Free	2021
Forwards
9	Danny Ward	CF/LW	(England)	Bradford	27	20	4	Rotherham United	1 July 2017	£1,600,000	2020
10	Kenneth Zohore	CF	(Denmark)	Copenhagen	24	81	23	KV Kortrijk	6 July 2016	£300,000	2020
26	Frédéric Gounongbe	CF	(Benin) (Belgium)	Brussels	30	15	0	Westerlo	1 July 2016	Free	2018
27	Ibrahim Meite	CF	(England)	London	22	2	0	Harrow Borough	6 January 2017	Undisclosed	2018
29	Jamie Ward	CF/LW	(Northern Ireland) (England)	Birmingham	32	4	0	Nottingham Forest	31 January 2018	Loan	2018
35	Yanic Wildschut	LW/CF	(Netherlands)	Amsterdam	26	8	0	Norwich City	12 January 2018	Loan	2018
44	Gary Madine	CF	(England)	Gateshead	27	13	0	Bolton Wanderers	31 January 2018	£2,000,000	2021
Out on loan
1	Lee Camp	GK	(Northern Ireland) (England)	Derby	33	0	0	Rotherham United	1 July 2017	Free	2019
7	Lee Tomlin	AM/WG	(England)	Leicester	29	16	1	Bristol City	13 July 2017	Undisclosed	2020
22	Stuart O'Keefe	CM	(England)	Eye	27	45	2	Crystal Palace	28 January 2015	£910,000	2019
23	Matthew Kennedy	RW	(Scotland)	Irvine	23	22	0	Everton	2 February 2015	Undisclosed	2018
30	Omar Bogle	CF	(England)	Sandwell	24	12	3	Wigan Athletic	17 August 2017	£700,000	2020
37	Rhys Healey	CF	(England)	Manchester	23	13	1	Connah's Quay Nomads	28 January 2013	£25,000	2020

Appearances and goals for the club and contracts are up to date as of 6 May 2018.

=== Statistics ===
As of 6 May 2018

No.	Pos	Nat	Player	Total		Championship		FA Cup		League Cup	
No.	Pos	Nat	Player	Apps	Goals	Apps	Goals	Apps	Goals	Apps	Goals
2	DF	(England) ENG	Lee Peltier	30	0	27+3	0	0+0	0	0+0	0
3	DF	(England) ENG	Joe Bennett	42	1	39+0	1	3+0	0	0+0	0
4	DF	(England) ENG	Sean Morrison	43	7	38+1	7	3+0	0	1+0	0
5	DF	(Gabon) GAB	Bruno Ecuele Manga	43	1	35+3	0	3+0	1	2+0	0
6	DF	(Wales) WAL	Jazz Richards	11	0	5+1	0	3+0	0	2+0	0
8	MF	(England) ENG	Joe Ralls	40	7	37+0	7	2+0	0	0+1	0
9	FW	(England) ENG	Danny Ward	20	4	6+12	4	0+0	0	2+0	0
10	FW	(Denmark) DEN	Kenneth Zohore	39	9	30+6	9	3+0	0	0+0	0
11	MF	(England) ENG	Kadeem Harris	3	0	1+2	0	0+0	0	0+0	0
12	MF	(England) ENG	Liam Feeney	16	0	4+11	0	0+1	0	0+0	0
13	MF	(Republic of Ireland) IRL	Anthony Pilkington	13	5	1+7	3	1+2	1	1+1	1
14	DF	(Ivory Coast) CIV	Sol Bamba	46	4	43+3	4	0+0	0	0+0	0
15	DF	(England) ENG	Greg Halford	16	1	2+10	0	1+1	0	2+0	1
16	DF	(England) ENG	Matthew Connolly	5	0	4+0	0	0+0	0	1+0	0
17	MF	(Iceland) ISL	Aron Gunnarsson	20	1	17+3	1	0+0	0	0+0	0
18	DF	(Scotland) SCO	Callum Paterson	36	10	24+9	10	3+0	0	0+0	0
19	MF	(England) ENG	Nathaniel Mendez-Laing	41	7	32+5	6	2+0	0	0+2	1
20	MF	(France) FRA	Loïc Damour	32	0	18+9	0	1+2	0	1+1	0
21	MF	(Scotland) SCO	Craig Bryson	22	2	19+3	2	0+0	0	0+0	0
24	MF	(Serbia) SRB	Marko Grujić	14	1	12+1	1	1+0	0	0+0	0
25	GK	(Philippines) PHI	Neil Etheridge	47	0	45+0	0	2+0	0	0+0	0
26	FW	(Benin) BEN	Frédéric Gounongbe	3	0	0+3	0	0+0	0	0+0	0
27	FW	(England) ENG	Ibrahim Meite	1	0	0+0	0	0+0	0	0+1	0
28	GK	(Republic of Ireland) IRL	Brian Murphy	4	0	1+0	0	1+0	0	2+0	0
29	FW	(Northern Ireland) NIR	Jamie Ward	4	0	2+2	0	0+0	0	0+0	0
32	DF	(Senegal) SEN	Armand Traoré	4	1	3+1	1	0+0	0	0+0	0
33	MF	(Canada) CAN	Junior Hoilett	50	11	44+2	9	2+1	2	0+1	0
34	DF	(Wales) WAL	Cameron Coxe	1	0	0+0	0	0+0	0	1+0	0
35	MF	(Netherlands) NED	Yanic Wildschut	10	0	2+8	0	0+0	0	0+0	0
44	FW	(England) ENG	Gary Madine	13	0	5+8	0	0+0	0	0+0	0
Players out on Loan:
7	MF	(England) ENG	Lee Tomlin (at Nottingham Forest)	15	1	5+7	1	1+0	0	2+0	0
22	MF	(England) ENG	Stuart O'Keefe (at Portsmouth)	2	0	0+0	0	0+0	0	2+0	0
23	MF	(Scotland) SCO	Matthew Kennedy (at Portsmouth)	3	0	0+1	0	0+0	0	2+0	0
30	FW	(England) ENG	Omar Bogle (at Peterborough United)	12	3	4+6	3	0+1	0	1+0	0
37	FW	(England) ENG	Rhys Healey (at Torquay United)	5	0	1+2	0	1+1	0	0+0	0

==== Goals record ====
As of 6 May 2018

Rank	No.	Nat.	Po.	Name	Championship	FA Cup	League Cup	Total
1	33	(Canada)	LW	Junior Hoilett	9	2	0	11
2	18	(Scotland)	RB	Callum Paterson	10	0	0	10
3	10	(Denmark)	CF	Kenneth Zohore	9	0	0	9
4	4	(England)	CB	Sean Morrison	7	0	0	7
4	8	(England)	CM	Joe Ralls	7	0	0	7
4	19	(England)	RW	Nathaniel Mendez-Laing	6	0	1	7
7	13	(Republic of Ireland)	LW	Anthony Pilkington	3	1	1	5
8	9	(England)	CF	Danny Ward	4	0	0	4
9	14	(Ivory Coast)	CB	Sol Bamba	3	0	0	3
9	30	(England)	CF	Omar Bogle	3	0	0	3
11	21	(Scotland)	CM	Craig Bryson	2	0	0	2
12	3	(England)	LB	Joe Bennett	1	0	0	1
12	5	(Gabon)	CB	Bruno Ecuele Manga	0	1	0	1
12	7	(England)	AM	Lee Tomlin	1	0	0	1
12	15	(England)	CB	Greg Halford	0	0	1	1
12	17	(Iceland)	CM	Aron Gunnarsson	1	0	0	1
12	24	(Serbia)	DM	Marko Grujić	1	0	0	1
12	32	(Senegal)	LB	Armand Traoré	1	0	0	1
Total					69	4	3	76

==== Disciplinary record ====
As of 6 May 2018

Rank	No.	Nat.	Po.	Name	Championship			FA Cup			League Cup			Total		
Rank	No.	Nat.	Po.	Name	Yellow card	(yellow card) (yellow-red card)	Red card	Yellow card	(yellow card) (yellow-red card)	Red card	Yellow card	(yellow card) (yellow-red card)	Red card	Yellow card	(yellow card) (yellow-red card)	Red card
1	2	(England)	RB	Lee Peltier	11	0	0	0	0	0	0	0	0	11	0	0
2	3	(England)	LB	Joe Bennett	7	0	0	1	1	0	0	0	0	8	1	0
3	8	(England)	CM	Joe Ralls	8	0	0	0	0	0	0	0	0	8	0	0
4	14	(Ivory Coast)	CB	Sol Bamba	7	0	0	0	0	0	0	0	0	7	0	0
5	4	(England)	CB	Sean Morrison	5	0	0	1	0	0	0	0	0	6	0	0
6	5	(Gabon)	CB	Bruno Ecuele Manga	4	0	0	1	0	0	0	0	0	5	0	0
6	18	(Scotland)	RB	Callum Paterson	4	0	0	1	0	0	0	0	0	5	0	0
6	20	(France)	CM	Loïc Damour	5	0	0	0	0	0	0	0	0	5	0	0
9	21	(Scotland)	CM	Craig Bryson	4	0	0	0	0	0	0	0	0	4	0	0
9	24	(Serbia)	DM	Marko Grujić	4	0	0	0	0	0	0	0	0	4	0	0
11	15	(England)	RB	Greg Halford	3	0	0	0	0	0	0	0	0	3	0	0
11	17	(Iceland)	CM	Aron Gunnarsson	3	0	0	0	0	0	0	0	0	3	0	0
11	33	(Canada)	LW	Junior Hoilett	2	0	0	1	0	0	0	0	0	3	0	0
14	6	(Wales)	RB	Jazz Richards	2	0	0	0	0	0	0	0	0	2	0	0
14	7	(England)	AM	Lee Tomlin	2	0	0	0	0	0	0	0	0	2	0	0
14	16	(England)	CB	Matthew Connolly	2	0	0	0	0	0	0	0	0	2	0	0
14	30	(England)	CF	Omar Bogle	1	0	1	0	0	0	0	0	0	1	0	1
18	12	(England)	RM	Liam Feeney	1	0	0	0	0	0	0	0	0	1	0	0
18	13	(Republic of Ireland)	LW	Anthony Pilkington	1	0	0	0	0	0	0	0	0	1	0	0
18	19	(England)	RW	Nathaniel Mendez-Laing	1	0	0	0	0	0	0	0	0	1	0	0
18	25	(Philippines)	GK	Neil Etheridge	1	0	0	0	0	0	0	0	0	1	0	0
18	26	(Benin)	CF	Frédéric Gounongbe	1	0	0	0	0	0	0	0	0	1	0	0
18	28	(Republic of Ireland)	GK	Brian Murphy	0	0	0	0	0	0	1	0	0	1	0	0
18	29	(Northern Ireland)	CF	Jamie Ward	1	0	0	0	0	0	0	0	0	1	0	0
18	34	(Wales)	RB	Cameron Coxe	0	0	0	0	0	0	1	0	0	1	0	0
18	44	(England)	CF	Gary Madine	1	0	0	0	0	0	0	0	0	1	0	0
Total					78	0	1	5	1	0	2	0	0	85	1	1

==== Suspensions ====
Player	Date received	Offence	Length of suspension	
Omar Bogle	4 November 2017	(red card) vs Bristol City	3 matches	Brentford (H), Barnsley (A), Nottingham Forest (A) (Championship)
Lee Peltier	4 November 2017	5 yellow cards	1 match	Brentford (H) (Championship)
Joe Bennett	28 January 2018	(yellow card) (yellow-red card) vs Manchester City	1 match	Leeds United (A)

Last updated: 28 January 2018.
Source: Football Association

=== Contracts ===
Date	Position	Nationality	Name	Status	Contract Length	Expiry Date	Ref.
20 July 2017	CB	(England)	Sean Morrison	Signed	3 years	June 2020	
25 August 2017	CB	(Ivory Coast)	Sol Bamba	Signed	3 years	June 2020	
30 October 2017	CF	(England)	Rhys Healey	Signed	3 years	June 2020	
30 November 2017	CM	(Iceland)	Aron Gunnarsson	Rejected	—	June 2018	
26 June 2018	LW	(Canada)	Junior Hoilett	Signed	3 years	June 2021	
29 June 2018	GK	(Philippines) (England)	Neil Etheridge	Signed	3 years	June 2021	

== Transfers ==
=== Transfers in ===
Date	Position	Nationality	Name	From	Fee	Ref.
1 July 2017	GK	(Northern Ireland)	Lee Camp	Rotherham United	Free	
1 July 2017	GK	(Philippines)	Neil Etheridge	Walsall	Free	
1 July 2017	RW	(England)	Nathaniel Mendez-Laing	Rochdale	Free	
1 July 2017	RB	(Scotland)	Callum Paterson	Heart of Midlothian	Bosman (~£400,000)	(Note: Although officially undisclosed, Cardiff reportedly paid a training compensation fee of £400,000.)
1 July 2017	CF	(England)	Danny Ward	Rotherham United	£1,600,000	(Note: Although officially undisclosed, Sky Sports reported the fee to be £1,600,000 plus add ons.)
6 July 2017	CM	(France)	Loïc Damour	Bourg-Péronnas	Free	
13 July 2017	AM	(England)	Lee Tomlin	Bristol City	£1,500,000	
21 July 2017	AM	(England)	Tyrone Duffus	Everton	Free transfer	(Note: Joined the U-23 squad for the 2017–18 season.)
17 August 2017	CF	(England)	Omar Bogle	Wigan Athletic	£700,000	
16 November 2017	CB	(Venezuela)	Rolf Feltscher	Free agent	Free transfer	
22 January 2018	CB	(England)	Ciaron Brown	Wealdstone	Undisclosed	
22 January 2018	CF	(Scotland)	Jack McKay	Free Agent	Free transfer	
22 January 2018	CB	(Scotland)	Paul McKay	Free Agent	Free transfer	
22 January 2018	CF	(Nigeria)	Ogo Obi	Free Agent	Free transfer	
31 January 2018	CF	(England)	Gary Madine	Bolton Wanderers	£5,000,000	
8 March 2018	GK	(United States)	Chris Konopka	Free agent	Free transfer	

- Spent: ▼ – £11,900,000

=== Loans in ===
Start date	Position	Nationality	Name	From	End date	Ref.
31 August 2017	CM	(Scotland)	Craig Bryson	Derby County	30 June 2018	
31 August 2017	RM	(England)	Liam Feeney	Blackburn Rovers	30 June 2018 (Note: On 5 January 2018, Feeney's loan was extended to 30 June 2018.)	
12 January 2018	LW	(Netherlands)	Yanic Wildschut	Norwich City	30 June 2018	
17 January 2018	DM	(Serbia)	Marko Grujić	Liverpool	30 June 2018	
31 January 2018	CF	(Northern Ireland)	Jamie Ward	Nottingham Forest	30 June 2018	
2 February 2018	LB	(Senegal)	Armand Traoré	Nottingham Forest	30 June 2018	

=== Transfers out ===
Date	Position	Nationality	Name	To	Fee	Ref.
1 July 2017	CM	(England)	Tom Adeyemi	Ipswich Town	Released	(Note: Following his release, Adeyemi joined Ipswich Town.)
1 July 2017	CB	(Nigeria)	Semi Ajayi	Rotherham United	Undisclosed	
1 July 2017	CF	(Wales)	Jamie Bird	Unattached	Released	
1 July 2017	CB	(France)	Jordan Blaise	Unattached	Released	
1 July 2017	DM	(Wales)	Emyr Huws	Ipswich Town	Undisclosed	
1 July 2017	CF	(England)	Adam Le Fondre	Bolton Wanderers	Free	
1 July 2017	GK	(England)	Luke O'Reilly	Unattached	Released	
1 July 2017	CB	(England)	Deji Oshilaja	AFC Wimbledon	Free	
1 July 2017	LM	(Wales)	Robbie Patten	Unattached	Released	
1 July 2017	CM	(Wales)	Macauley Southam	Unattached	Released	
1 July 2017	CM	(Saint Kitts and Nevis)	Theo Wharton	York City	Released	(Note: Following his release, Wharton joined York City.)
1 July 2017	CM	(England)	Peter Whittingham	Blackburn Rovers	Free	
6 July 2017	CF	(England)	Rickie Lambert	Unattached	Released	
21 July 2017	CF	(Algeria)	Idriss Saadi	RC Strasbourg	£1,350,000	
31 August 2017	RW	(England)	Craig Noone	Bolton Wanderers	Undisclosed	
19 December 2017	CB	(Venezuela)	Rolf Feltscher	LA Galaxy	Released	
22 December 2017	LB	(Wales)	Declan John	Rangers	Undisclosed	
17 February 2018	GK	(England)	Oliver Byrne	Blackburn Rovers	Undisclosed	

- Income: ▲ – £1,350,000

=== Loans out ===
Start date	Position	Nationality	Name	To	End date	Ref.
4 August 2017	GK	(England)	Ben Wilson	Oldham Athletic	4 January 2018	
25 August 2017	CF	(England)	Ibrahim Meite	Crawley Town	4 January 2018	
31 August 2017	LB	(Wales)	Declan John	Rangers	22 December 2017	(Note: John signed a permanent deal with Rangers on 22 December.)
31 August 2017	CM	(England)	Stuart O'Keefe	Portsmouth	30 June 2018	
31 August 2017	RW	(Scotland)	Matthew Kennedy	Portsmouth	30 June 2018	
2 November 2017	GK	(England)	Oliver Byrne	Chorley	31 December 2017	
10 November 2017	AM	(England)	Tyrone Duffus	Hereford	January 2018	
31 January 2018	AM	(England)	Lee Tomlin	Nottingham Forest	30 June 2018	
31 January 2018	CF	(England)	Omar Bogle	Peterborough United	30 June 2018	
1 February 2018	GK	(Northern Ireland)	Lee Camp	Sunderland	30 June 2018	
16 March 2018	CF	(England)	Rhys Healey	Torquay United	30 June 2018	

== Competitions ==
=== Friendlies ===
As of 6 June 2017, Cardiff City had announced five pre-season friendlies against Taff's Well, Tavistock, Bodmin Town, Plymouth Argyle and Shrewsbury Town.

A joint decision was made on 19 June 2017 to cancel the scheduled friendly with Portsmouth as the clubs were drawn together in the EFL Cup first round.

14 July 2017	Taff's Well	0–1	Cardiff City	Taff's Well
19:00 BST		Report	Pilkington 7'	Stadium: Rhiw Dda'r

17 July 2017	Tavistock	2–7	Cardiff City	Tavistock
19:00 BST	Carter 25', 70' (pen.)	Report	Mendez-Laing 2', 42'; Saadi 13', 40'; Zohore 20', 30'; Ralls 90'	Stadium: Langsford Park

19 July 2017	Bodmin Town	1–3	Cardiff City	Bodmin
19:00 BST	Watson 30' (pen.)	Report	Damour 9', 51'; Zohore 54'	Stadium: Priory Park

21 July 2017	Plymouth Argyle	0–1	Cardiff City	Plymouth
19:00 BST		Official Report	49' Zohore	Stadium: Home Park

25 July 2017	Shrewsbury Town	2–1	Cardiff City	Shrewsbury
19:00 BST	Whalley 49' (pen.); Dodds 50'	Report	Mendez-Laing 44'	Stadium: Greenhous Meadow

28 July 2017	Cardiff City	4–0	Livingston	Cardiff
19:00 BST	Hoilett 12'; Ward 57', 63'; Ecuele Manga 75'	Report		Stadium: Cardiff City Stadium

=== Championship ===
==== League table ====
Pos	Team	Pld	W	D	L	GF	GA	GD	Pts	Promotion, qualification or relegation
1	Wolverhampton Wanderers (C, P)	46	30	9	7	82	39	+43	99	Promotion to the Premier League
2	Cardiff City (P)	46	27	9	10	69	39	+30	90	Promotion to the Premier League
3	Fulham (O, P)	46	25	13	8	79	46	+33	88	Qualification for Championship play-offs (Note: Four teams play for one spot and promotion to the Premier League.)
4	Aston Villa	46	24	11	11	72	42	+30	83	Qualification for Championship play-offs
5	Middlesbrough	46	22	10	14	67	45	+22	76	Qualification for Championship play-offs

Source: English Football League
Rules for classification: 1) Points; 2) Goal difference; 3) Number of goals scored
(C) Champions; (O) Play-off winners; (P) Promoted

==== Results summary ====
Overall								Home						Away					
Pld	W	D	L	GF	GA	GD	Pts	W	D	L	GF	GA	GD	W	D	L	GF	GA	GD
46	27	9	10	69	39	+30	90	16	4	3	40	16	+24	11	5	7	29	23	+6

Last updated: 6 May 2018.

==== Results by matchday ====
Matchday	1	2	3	4	5	6	7	8	9	10	11	12	13	14	15	16	17	18	19	20	21	22	23	24	25	26	27	28	29	30	31	32	33	34	35	36	37	38	39	40	41	42	43	44	45	46
Ground	A	H	H	A	H	A	A	H	A	H	H	A	A	H	H	A	H	A	A	H	A	H	A	H	H	A	H	A	A	A	H	H	A	H	H	H	A	H	A	H	A	A	H	A	A	H
Result	W	W	W	W	W	D	L	D	W	W	D	L	W	D	W	L	W	W	W	W	D	W	L	L	L	L	W	D	W	D	W	W	W	W	W	W	W	W	D	L	L	W	W	L	W	D
Position	4	1	1	1	1	1	2	3	3	1	1	2	2	3	2	3	3	2	2	2	2	2	2	3	4	3	3	3	4	4	4	2	2	2	2	2	2	2	2	2	3	2	2	2	2	2

Updated to match(es) played on 6 May 2018. Source: Statto.com
A = Away; H = Home; W = Win; D = Draw; L = Loss

==== Fixtures ====
5 August 2017 1	Burton Albion	0–1	Cardiff City	Burton upon Trent
15:00 BST	McFadzean (yellow card) 4'	Report	87' Zohore	Stadium: Pirelli Stadium; Attendance: 5,050; Referee: Geoff Eltringham (Durham)

12 August 2017 2	Cardiff City	3–0	Aston Villa	Cardiff
15:00 BST	Mendez-Laing 21'; Hoilett 60'; Mendez-Laing 71'	BBC Report		Stadium: Cardiff City Stadium; Attendance: 23,899; Referee: Tim Robinson (West Sussex)

15 August 2017 3	Cardiff City	2–0	Sheffield United	Cardiff
19:45 BST	Mendez-Laing (yellow card) 20', (goal) 55'; Bamba (yellow card) 23'; Morrison 44'	Report	(yellow card) 21' Basham	Stadium: Cardiff City Stadium; Attendance: 17,844; Referee: Lee Mason (Bolton)

19 August 2017 4	Wolverhampton Wanderers	1–2	Cardiff City	Wolverhampton
15:00 BST	Saïss (yellow card) 28'; Bonatini 67'	Report	(yellow card) 19' Hoilett; (yellow card) 39', (goal) 54' Joe Ralls; (yellow card) 45+1' Damour, (yellow card) 56' Peltier; 77' Mendez-Laing	Stadium: Molineux Stadium; Attendance: 27,068; Referee: Scott Duncan (Northumberland)

26 August 2017 5	Cardiff City	2–1	Queens Park Rangers	Cardiff
15:00 BST	Hoilett 22'; Bamba 45+1'	Report	15' Smith; (yellow card) 38' Furlong	Stadium: Cardiff City Stadium; Attendance: 18,520; Referee: Simon Hooper (Wiltshire)

9 September 2017 6	Fulham	1–1	Cardiff City	London
15:00 BST	Mollo (yellow card) 29'; McDonald (yellow card) 70'; Johansen (yellow card) 70'; Sessegnon 75'; Button (yellow card) 82'	Report	(yellow card) 30' Bennett; (yellow card) 36' Morrison; (yellow card) 79' Peltier; 83' Ward	Stadium: Craven Cottage; Attendance: 20,984; Referee: Tony Harrington (Cleveland)

12 September 2017 7	Preston North End	3–0	Cardiff City	Preston
19:45 BST	Fisher (yellow card) 7'; Harrop 38', (yellow card) 75'; Welsh (yellow card) 64'; Maguire 70'; Browne 78'	Report	(yellow card) 24' Gunnarsson; (yellow card) 39' Bamba; (yellow card) 82' Peltier	Stadium: Deepdale; Attendance: 10,796; Referee: Oliver Langford (West Midlands)

16 September 2017 8	Cardiff City	1–1	Sheffield Wednesday	Leckwith, Cardiff
15:00 BST	Peltier (yellow card) 29'; Bamba 90+4'	Report	Hooper 39'; Pudil (yellow card) 44' van Aken (yellow card) 62'	Stadium: Cardiff City Stadium; Attendance: 19,137; Referee: Lee Probert (Wiltshire)

23 September 2017 9	Sunderland	1–2	Cardiff City	Sunderland
15:00 BST	Cattermole (yellow card) 11'; Gooch 53' (pen.); Browning (yellow card) 70'; Koné (yellow card) 73'	Report	Richards (yellow card) 19'; Bryson 7'; Gunnarsson (yellow card) 60'; Ralls 73' (pen.) (yellow card) 81'	Stadium: Stadium of Light; Attendance: 25,733; Referee: Peter Bankes (Merseyside)

26 September 2017 10	Cardiff City	3–1	Leeds United	Cardiff
19:45 BST	Zohore 28', 59'; Hoilett 37'	Report	Phillips (yellow card) 23'; Cooper (yellow card) 39' (yellow-red card) 45+3'; Roofe 67'	Stadium: Cardiff City Stadium; Attendance: 27,160; Referee: Kevin Friend (Leicestershire)
Note: Live on Sky TV

30 September 2017 11	Cardiff City	0–0	Derby County	Cardiff
15:00 BST	Damour (yellow card) 66'; Bennett (yellow card) 79'	Report	Johnson (yellow card) 87'	Stadium: Cardiff City Stadium; Attendance: 18,840; Referee: James Linington (Isle of Wight)

13 October 2017 12	Birmingham City	1–0	Cardiff City	Birmingham
19:45 BST	Adams 19'; Davis (yellow card) 60'; Kieftenbeld (yellow card) 62'	Report	Bryson (yellow card) 62'	Stadium: St Andrew's; Attendance: 19,059; Referee: Geoff Eltringham (Durham)
Note: Live on Sky TV

21 October 2017 13	Middlesbrough	0–1	Cardiff City	Middlesbrough
15:00 BST	Gibson (yellow card) 20'; Leadbitter (yellow card) 66'	Report	Bennett (yellow card) 39'; Bamba (yellow card) 59'; Ralls 84' (pen.)	Stadium: Riverside Stadium; Attendance: 24,806; Referee: Andrew Madley (Huddersfield)

28 October 2017 14	Cardiff City	0–0	Millwall	Cardiff
15:00 BST	Ralls (yellow card) 78'; Tomlin (yellow card) 88'	Report	Meredith (yellow card) 72'	Stadium: Cardiff City Stadium; Attendance: 18,496; Referee: Stephen Martin (Staffordshire)

31 October 2017 15	Cardiff City	3–1	Ipswich Town	Cardiff
19:45 GMT	Hoilett 12'; Bogle 46'; Morrison (yellow card) 83'; Ward 90+1'	Report	Smith (yellow card) 60'; Celina 90'	Stadium: Cardiff City Stadium; Attendance: 15,951; Referee: Oliver Langford (West Midlands)

4 November 2017 16	Bristol City	2–1	Cardiff City	Bristol
12:00 GMT	O'Dowda 20'; Pack (yellow card) 31'; Bryan (yellow card) 51'; Flint 66'; Woodrow (yellow card) 88'	Report	Peltier (yellow card) 4'; Bogle 41', (red card) 55'; Bryson (yellow card) 57'	Stadium: Ashton Gate Stadium; Attendance: 21,692; Referee: Mike Jones (Chester)

18 November 2017 17	Cardiff City	2–0	Brentford	Cardiff
15:00 GMT	Ralls 8'; Ward 36'; Feeney (yellow card) 59'; Manga (yellow card) 84'	Report		Stadium: Cardiff City Stadium; Attendance: 16,335; Referee: Andy Madley (Huddersfield)

21 November 2017 18	Barnsley	0–1	Cardiff City	Barnsley
19:45 GMT		Report	Ralls (yellow card) 79'; Paterson 83'; Bamba (yellow card) 90+1'	Stadium: Oakwell; Attendance: 11,051; Referee: David Coote (Nottinghamshire)

26 November 2017 19	Nottingham Forest	0–2	Cardiff City	Nottingham
13:00 GMT	Traore (yellow card) 14'	Report	Hoilett 24'; Ward 38'; Paterson (yellow card) 66'; Gounongbe (yellow card) 87'	Stadium: The City Ground; Attendance: 25,210; Referee: Peter Bankes (Merseyside)

1 December 2017 20	Cardiff City	3–1	Norwich City	Cardiff
19:45 GMT	Ralls 49' (pen.); Tomlin (yellow card) 54'; Hoilett 63'; Bogle 80'	Report	Klose (yellow card) 36'; Stiepermann 43'; Gunn (yellow card) 77'	Stadium: Cardiff City Stadium; Attendance: 17,033; Referee: Andy Davies (Hampshire)

11 December 2017 21	Reading	2–2	Cardiff City	Reading
20:00 GMT	Paterson 16' (o.g.); Barrow 41'; Kelly (yellow card) 51'; Bacuna (yellow card) 87'	Report	Bogle (yellow card) 32'; Bennett 83'; Tomlin 90+1'	Stadium: Madjeski Stadium; Attendance: 16,670; Referee: Stephen Martin (Staffordshire)
Note: Live on Sky

16 December 2017 22	Cardiff City	1–0	Hull City	Cardiff
17:30 GMT	Bamba (yellow card) 51', (goal) 57'	Report		Stadium: Cardiff City Stadium; Attendance: 18,049; Referee: Scott Duncan (Northumberland)
Note: Live on Sky TV

23 December 2017 23	Bolton Wanderers	2–0	Cardiff City	Horwich, Bolton
15:00 GMT	Pratley (yellow card) 41'; Henry (yellow card) 61'; Madine 75' (pen.), (yellow card) 87'; Vela 88'	BBC Report	Damour (yellow card) 56'; Peltier (yellow card) 77'; Ecuele Manga (yellow card) 78'; Halford (yellow card) 82'	Stadium: Macron Stadium; Attendance: 15,344; Referee: Darren Bond (Lancashire)

26 December 2017 24	Cardiff City	2–4	Fulham	Cardiff
15:00 GMT	Zohore 57'; Ralls (yellow card) 90'; Paterson 90+2'	Report	Ream 12'; Ayité (yellow card) 34', (goal) 56'; Fredericks (yellow card) 43'; Sessegnon 78'; Odoi (yellow card) 82'; Bettinelli (yellow card) 90+2'; Johansen 90+7'	Stadium: Cardiff City Stadium; Attendance: 21,662; Referee: Simon Hooper (Wiltshire)

29 December 2017 25	Cardiff City	0–1	Preston North End	Cardiff
19:45 GMT	Peltier (yellow card) 22'; Paterson (yellow card) 90+4'	Report	Barkhuizen (yellow card) 27'; Browne (yellow card) 36'; Pearson (yellow card) 48'; Clarke 90'; Hugill (yellow card) 90+4'	Stadium: Cardiff City Stadium; Attendance: 17,751; Referee: James Linington (Isle of Wight)
Note: Live on Sky TV

1 January 2018 26	Queens Park Rangers	2–1	Cardiff City	Shepherd's Bush
15:00 GMT	Smith 62'; Smyth 72'	Report	Ralls 54' (pen.)	Stadium: Loftus Road; Attendance: 13,801; Referee: Tim Robinson (West Sussex)

13 January 2018 27	Cardiff City	4–0	Sunderland	Cardiff
12:30 GMT	Paterson 46', 80'; Ralls 55'; Morrison (yellow card) 85'; Pilkington 90+4'	Report	Oviedo (yellow card) 41'; Gooch (yellow card) 45+1'; Ndong (red card) 49'	Stadium: Cardiff City Stadium; Attendance: 17,703; Referee: Andrew Madley (Huddersfield)
Note: Live on Sky

20 January 2018 28	Sheffield Wednesday	0–0	Cardiff City	Sheffield
17:30 GMT	Grujić (yellow card) 8'; Bamba (yellow card) 40'; Richards (yellow card) 90+2'	Report	Wallace (yellow card) 77'	Stadium: Hillsborough Stadium; Attendance: 23,277; Referee: Roger East (Wiltshire)
Note: Live on Sky TV

3 February 2018 29	Leeds United	1–4	Cardiff City	Leeds
15:00 GMT	Berardi (red card) 26'; Bamba 54' (o.g.)	Report	Paterson 9'; Madine (yellow card) 35'; Hoilett 41'; Ralls (yellow card) 45+1'; Morrison 45+5'; Pilkington (yellow card) 79'; Grujić (yellow card) 81'; Pilkington 88'	Stadium: Elland Road; Attendance: 30,534; Referee: Graham Scott (Oxfordshire)

9 February 2018 30	Millwall	1–1	Cardiff City	London
17:45 GMT	Romeo (yellow card) 2'; Gregory 40'; Cooper (yellow card) 71'	Report	Hoilett 3'	Stadium: The Den; Attendance: 13,204; Referee: Keith Stroud (Hampshire)
Note: Live on Sky TV

13 February 2018 31	Cardiff City	2–0	Bolton Wanderers	Cardiff
19:45 GMT	Traoré 34'; Morrison 44'	Report	Beevers (yellow card) 43'	Stadium: Cardiff City Stadium; Attendance: 16,013; Referee: Tim Robinson (West Sussex)

17 February 2018 32	Cardiff City	1–0	Middlesbrough	Cardiff
15:00 GMT	Morrison 33'	Report	Bešić (yellow card) 45'	Stadium: Cardiff City Stadium; Attendance: 18,720; Referee: Darren Bond (Lancashire)

21 February 2018 33	Ipswich Town	0–1	Cardiff City	Ipswich
19:45 GMT		Report	Zohore 65'; Bryson (yellow card) 90+1'	Stadium: Portman Road; Attendance: 13,205; Referee: Andy Davies (Hampshire)

25 February 2018 34	Cardiff City	1–0	Bristol City	Cardiff
12:00 GMT	Connolly (yellow card) 14'; Halford (yellow card) 65'; Zohore 82'	Report	Baker (yellow card) 5'	Stadium: Cardiff City Stadium; Attendance: 21,018; Referee: Paul Tierney (Lancashire)

3 March 2018	Brentford	v	Cardiff City	London
15:00 GMT				Stadium: Griffin Park
Note: Postponed due to unsafe conditions

6 March 2018 35	Cardiff City	2–1	Barnsley	Cardiff
19:45 GMT	Grujić (yellow card) 14', (goal) 46'; Paterson 31'; Halford (yellow card) 81'	Report	Gardner (yellow card) 14'; McBurnie 60'; Yiadom (yellow card) 83'; Moore (yellow card) 85'	Stadium: Cardiff City Stadium; Attendance: 16,176; Referee: Robert Jones (Merseyside)

10 March 2018 36	Cardiff City	3–2	Birmingham City	Cardiff
15:00 GMT	Mendez-Laing 12'; Bryson 23'; Paterson 45+3'; Bamba (yellow card) 58'; Etheridge (yellow card) 78'; Bennett (yellow card) 90+6'	Report	Gardner 54' (pen.); Morrison (yellow card) 88'; Colin 90+5'	Stadium: Cardiff City Stadium; Attendance: 19,634; Referee: Peter Bankes (Merseyside)

13 March 2018 37	Brentford	1–3	Cardiff City	London
19:45 GMT	Maupay 5'; Mepham (yellow card) 65'	Report	Ecuele Manga (yellow card) 18'; Bamba 25'; Paterson 45+2'; Damour (yellow card) 55'; Zohore 58'; Morrison (yellow card) 71'	Stadium: Griffin Park; Referee: James Linington (Isle of Wight)
Note: Live On Sky TV.

18 March 2018	Derby County	v	Cardiff City	Derby
12:00 GMT				Stadium: Pride Park Stadium
Note: Postponed due to unsafe conditions

30 March 2018 38	Cardiff City	3–1	Burton Albion	Cardiff
15:00 BST	Zohore 16'; Mendez-Laing 45+1'; Paterson 64'	BBC Report	Bent 21'	Stadium: Cardiff City Stadium; Attendance: 21,086; Referee: Simon Hooper (Wiltshire)

2 April 2018 39	Sheffield United	1–1	Cardiff City	Sheffield
19:45 BST	Clarke 28'	Report	Bennett (yellow card) 29'; Pilkington 90+1'	Stadium: Bramall Lane; Attendance: 25,231; Referee: Michael Oliver (Northumberland)
Note: Live On Sky TV

6 April 2018 40	Cardiff City	0–1	Wolverhampton Wanderers	Cardiff
19:45 BST	Peltier (yellow card) 62'; Morrison (yellow card) 66'	Report	Neves 67', (yellow card) 90+6'; Saïss (yellow card) 75'; Costa (yellow card) 89'	Stadium: Cardiff City Stadium; Attendance: 29,317; Referee: Mike Dean (Cheshire)
Note: Live on Sky TV

10 April 2018 41	Aston Villa	1–0	Cardiff City	Birmingham
19:45 BST	Hourihane (yellow card) 20'; Snodgrass (yellow card) 45'; Grealish 85'; Johnstone (yellow card) 90+4'; Kodjia (yellow card) 90+5'	Report	Paterson (yellow card) 37'; Gunnarsson (yellow card) 78'; Bennett (yellow card) 81'; Ward (yellow card) 89'; Peltier (yellow card) 90+5'	Stadium: Villa Park; Attendance: 32,560; Referee: Jeremy Simpson (Lancashire)
Note: Live on Sky TV

14 April 2018 42	Norwich City	0–2	Cardiff City	Norwich
15:00 BST	Murphy (yellow card) 90+2'	Report	Damour (yellow card) 44'; Peltier (yellow card) 66'; Zohore 86'; Hoilett 90+3'	Stadium: Carrow Road; Attendance: 25,503; Referee: Tim Robinson (West Sussex)

21 April 2018 43	Cardiff City	2–1	Nottingham Forest	Cardiff
19:45 BST	Morrison 35'; Gunnarsson 74'	Report	50' Bridcutt; (yellow card) 73' Mancienne; (yellow card) 73' Watson; (yellow card) 90' Colback	Stadium: Cardiff City Stadium; Attendance: 21,310; Referee: Peter Bankes (Merseyside)
Note: Live on Sky TV

24 April 2018 44	Derby County	3–1	Cardiff City	Derby
19:45 BST	Jerome 69', 90'; Vydra 82'	Report	Paterson (yellow card) 11', (goal) 28'; Manga (yellow card) 53'; Bennett (yellow card) 66'; Ralls (yellow card) 70'	Stadium: Pride Park Stadium; Attendance: 30,294; Referee: Andrew Madley (Huddersfield)
Note: Live on Sky TV

28 April 2018 45	Hull City	0–2	Cardiff City	Kingston upon Hull
15:00 BST	Kingsley (yellow card) 3'; Henriksen (yellow card) 45'; Meyler (yellow card) 70'	Report	Grujic (yellow card) 30'; Morrison 32', 80'; Ralls (yellow card) 60'	Stadium: KCOM Stadium; Attendance: 17,441; Referee: Andy Davies (Hampshire)

6 May 2018 46	Cardiff City	0–0	Reading	Cardiff
15:00 BST	Hoilett (yellow card) 58'	Report	Elphick (yellow card) 27'; Kermorgant (yellow card) 74'	Stadium: Cardiff City Stadium; Attendance: 32,478; Referee: Robert Madley (Yorkshire)
Note: Live on Sky TV

=== FA Cup ===
In the FA Cup, Cardiff City entered the competition in the third round and were drawn at home versus Mansfield Town. A goalless draw at Cardiff City Stadium resulted in a replay which took place on 16 January 2018, won by Cardiff City. They were drawn at home against Manchester City in the fourth round, losing 0–2.

6 January 2018 Third Round	Cardiff City	0–0	Mansfield Town	Cardiff
15:00 GMT		Report		Stadium: Cardiff City Stadium; Attendance: 6,378; Referee: Lee Probert (Wiltshire)

16 January 2018 Replay	Mansfield Town	1–4	Cardiff City	Mansfield
19:45 GMT	Rose 35'	Report	Hoilett (yellow card) 25', (goal) 66', 89'; E Manga 34'; Bennett (yellow card) 58'; Paterson (yellow card) 61'; Morrison (yellow card) 64'; Pilkington 71'	Stadium: Field Mill; Referee: Geoff Eltringham (Durham)

28 January 2018 Fourth Round	Cardiff City	0–2	Manchester City	Cardiff
16:00 GMT	Bennett (yellow card) 45' (yellow-red card) 90+2'; Manga (yellow card) 77'	Report	De Bruyne 8'; Sterling 37'; Fernandinho (yellow card) 80'	Stadium: Cardiff City Stadium; Attendance: 32,339; Referee: Lee Mason (Bolton)
Note: Live on BBC TV

=== EFL Cup ===
On 16 June 2017, Cardiff City drew Portsmouth at home in the first round. After beating Portsmouth, Cardiff City were drawn against Burton Albion at home, losing 1–2.

8 August 2017 First round	Cardiff City	2–1 (a.e.t.)	Portsmouth	Leckwith, Cardiff
19:45 BST	Murphy (yellow card) 45'; Mendez-Laing 48'; Halford 113'	BBC Report	32' (o.g.) Morrison	Stadium: Cardiff City Stadium; Attendance: 6,592; Referee: Steve Martin (Staffordshire)

22 August 2017 Second round	Cardiff City	1–2	Burton Albion	Cardiff, Wales
19.45 BST	Coxe (yellow card) 34'; Pilkington 76'	Report	26' Naylor; (yellow card) 68' Irvine; 70' Fox	Stadium: Cardiff City Stadium; Attendance: 5,820; Referee: John Busby

== Summary ==
Games played	51 (46 Championship, 3 FA Cup, 2 League Cup)
Games won	29 (27 Championship, 1 FA Cup, 1 League Cup)
Games drawn	10 (9 Championship, 1 FA Cup, 0 League Cup)
Games lost	12 (10 Championship, 1 FA Cup, 1 League Cup)
Goals scored	76 (69 Championship, 4 FA Cup, 3 League Cup)
Goals conceded	45 (39 Championship, 3 FA Cup, 3 League Cup)
Goal difference	+31
Clean sheets	20 (19 Championship, 1 FA Cup, 0 League Cup)
Yellow cards	85 (78 Championship, 5 FA Cup, 2 League Cup)
Red cards	2 (1 Championship, 1 FA Cup, 0 League Cup)
Worst Discipline	Lee Peltier (11 (yellow card) , 0 (yellow card) (yellow-red card) , 0 (red card) )
Best result	4–0 vs Sunderland (13 Jan 18)
Worst result	0–3 vs Preston North End (12 Sep 17)
Most appearances	Junior Hoilett (46 starts, 4 subs)
Top scorer	Junior Hoilett (11)
Most Cleans Sheets	Neil Etheridge (19)
Points	90

== Club staff ==
=== Backroom staff ===
Position	Name
Manager	(England) Neil Warnock
Assistant manager	(England) Kevin Blackwell
First-team coach	(England) Ronnie Jepson
Goalkeeper coach	(Wales) Andy Dibble
Assistant coach	(Wales) James Rowberry
Head of medical services	(England) Paul Godfrey
Club doctor	(Wales) Dr. Len Nokes
First-team physiotherapist	(Wales) James Rowland
Head of Fitness & Conditioning	(England) Lee Southernwood
Senior Strength & Conditioning	(Wales) Mike Beere
Sports scientist	(Wales) Ben Parry
Head scout	(England) Glyn Chamberlain
First Team Analyst	(Wales) Jack Radusin
Player Liaison Officer	(Wales) Callum Davies
Kit and Equipment Manager	(Wales) Paul Carter

=== Board of directors ===
Position	Name
Chairman	(Cyprus) Mehmet Dalman
General Manager	(Malaysia) Ken Choo
Finance Director	(Wales) Richard Thompson
Non-Executive; Board Members; Football Club	(Wales) Steve Borley (since 2003) (Malaysia) Derek Chee Seng Chin (since 2010) (Malaysia) Veh Ken Choo (since 2016) (Cyprus) Mehmet Dalman (since 2012)
Non-Executive; Board Members; Cardiff City (Holdings)	(Malaysia) Danni Rais (since 2012)
Club Secretary	(England) David Beeby
