= 2019–20 Cardiff City F.C. season =

Welsh football club season

Cardiff City
2019–20 season
- Owner: Vincent Tan
- Chairman: Mehmet Dalman
- Manager: Neil Warnock (until 11 November); Neil Harris (From 16 November)
- Stadium: Cardiff City Stadium
- Championship: 5th
- FA Cup: Fourth round
- EFL Cup: Second round
- Top goalscorer: League: Lee Tomlin (8); All: Lee Tomlin (9)
- Highest home attendance: 28,529 (vs. Swansea City, 12 Jan 20)
- Lowest home attendance: 4,111 (vs. Luton Town, 27 Aug 19)
- Average home league attendance: 20,738
Home colours	Away colours	Third colours

The 2019–20 season was Cardiff City's 121st season in their existence and their first back in the EFL Championship. Cardiff were relegated to the second tier of English football after finishing 18th in the 2018–19 Premier League. Along with competing in the EFL Championship, the club also participated in the FA Cup and EFL Cup. The season covered the period from 1 July 2019 to 30 July 2020.

On 11 November 2019, Neil Warnock resigned as manager, Cardiff were 14th in the league, he was later replaced by Neil Harris on 16 November.

Due to the COVID-19 virus outbreak, all English football leagues were postponed until 30 April. The season restarted on 20 June 2020.

== First-team squad ==
No.	Name	Pos.	Nat.	Place of Birth	Age	Caps	Goals	Signed from	Date signed	Fee	Ends
Goalkeepers
1	Neil Etheridge	GK	(Philippines) (England)	London	30	102	0	Walsall	1 July 2017	Free	2021
12	Alex Smithies	GK	(England)	Huddersfield	30	37	0	Queens Park Rangers	1 July 2018	£4,000,000	2022
25	Joe Day	GK	(England)	Brighton	29	2	0	Newport County	1 July 2019	Free	2021
Defenders
2	Dion Sanderson	RB	(England)	Wednesfield	20	10	0	Wolverhampton Wanderers	31 January 2020	Loan	2020
3	Joe Bennett	LB	(England)	Rochdale	30	148	4	Aston Villa	27 August 2016	Free	2021
4	Sean Morrison	CB	(England)	Plymouth	29	235	25	Reading	15 August 2014	£3,180,000	2022
5	Aden Flint	CB	(England)	Pinxton	30	30	4	Middlesbrough	19 July 2019	£4,000,000	2022
16	Curtis Nelson	CB	(England)	Newcastle-under-Lyme	27	36	2	Oxford United	1 July 2019	Free	2021
18	Greg Cunningham	LB	(Republic of Ireland)	Galway	29	8	0	Preston North End	1 July 2018	£4,000,000	2021
22	Sol Bamba	CB	(Ivory Coast) (France)	Ivry-sur-Seine	35	110	10	Free agent	11 October 2016	Free	2021
24	Brad Smith	LB	(Australia)	Penrith	26	3	0	AFC Bournemouth	30 January 2020	Loan	2020
30	Ciaron Brown	CB	(Northern Ireland) (England)	Hillingdon	22	1	0	Wealdstone	January 2018	Trainee	2020
Midfielders
6	Will Vaulks	DM	(Wales) (England)	Wirral	26	34	4	Rotherham United	1 July 2019	£2,100,000	2022
7	Leandro Bacuna	CM/RB	(Curaçao) (Netherlands)	Groningen	28	56	1	Reading	31 January 2019	£4,000,000	2023
8	Joe Ralls	CM/LM	(England)	Aldershot	27	239	25	Academy	30 September 2011	Trainee	2022
11	Josh Murphy	LW	(England)	Wembley	25	63	11	Norwich City	12 June 2018	£11,000,000	2022
13	Callum Paterson	CM/RB/CF	(Scotland) (England)	London	25	106	21	Heart of Midlothian	1 July 2017	£400,000	2022
15	Marlon Pack	CM	(England)	Portsmouth	29	42	2	Bristol City	8 August 2019	Undisclosed	2022
19	Nathaniel Mendez-Laing	RW/LW	(England)	Birmingham	28	91	14	Rochdale	1 July 2017	Free	2021
20	Gavin Whyte	RW	(Northern Ireland)	Belfast	24	30	1	Oxford United	30 July 2019	£2,000,000	2023
31	Aaron Bolger	CM	(Republic of Ireland)	Dublin	20	0	0	Shamrock Rovers	2 July 2019	Undisclosed	2020
33	Junior Hoilett	LW/RW	(Canada)	Brampton	30	160	23	Free agent	10 October 2016	Free	2021
Forwards
9	Robert Glatzel	CF	(Germany)	Fürstenfeldbruck	26	35	8	1. FC Heidenheim	31 July 2019	£5,500,000	2022
10	Isaac Vassell	CF	(England)	Newquay	26	3	1	Birmingham City	8 August 2019	Undisclosed	2022
17	Lee Tomlin	SS/WG	(England)	Leicester	31	52	10	Bristol City	13 July 2017	Undisclosed	2022
23	Danny Ward	CF/LW	(England)	Bradford	29	69	13	Rotherham United	1 July 2017	£1,600,000	2020
	Mark Harris	LW/CF	(Wales)	Swansea	21	2	0	Academy	8 January 2017	Trainee	2020
Out on loan

Appearances and goals for the club and contracts are up to date as of 31 July 2020.

=== Statistics ===
As of 31 July 2020

No.	Pos	Nat	Player	Total		Championship		FA Cup		League Cup		Play-Offs	
No.	Pos	Nat	Player	Apps	Goals	Apps	Goals	Apps	Goals	Apps	Goals	Apps	Goals
1	GK	(Philippines) PHI	Neil Etheridge	17	0	16+0	0	1+0	0	0+0	0	0+0	0
2	DF	(England) ENG	Dion Sanderson	10	0	9+1	0	0+0	0	0+0	0	0+0	0
3	DF	(England) ENG	Joe Bennett	48	0	42+0	0	2+2	0	0+0	0	2+0	0
4	DF	(England) ENG	Sean Morrison	39	4	35+1	4	1+0	0	0+0	0	2+0	0
5	DF	(England) ENG	Aden Flint	30	4	26+0	2	3+0	2	1+0	0	0+0	0
6	MF	(Wales) WAL	Will Vaulks	34	4	18+9	4	4+0	0	1+0	0	1+1	0
7	MF	(Curaçao) CUW	Leandro Bacuna	45	1	35+6	1	2+0	0	0+0	0	2+0	0
8	MF	(England) ENG	Joe Ralls	31	7	25+2	7	2+0	0	0+0	0	2+0	0
9	FW	(Germany) GER	Robert Glatzel	35	8	23+7	7	2+1	1	0+0	0	1+1	0
10	FW	(England) ENG	Isaac Vassell	3	1	0+2	1	0+0	0	1+0	0	0+0	0
11	MF	(England) ENG	Josh Murphy	33	8	16+11	5	4+0	3	0+0	0	1+1	0
12	GK	(England) ENG	Alex Smithies	36	0	31+0	0	3+0	0	0+0	0	2+0	0
13	MF	(Scotland) SCO	Callum Paterson	42	7	18+18	5	3+1	2	1+0	0	0+1	0
15	MF	(England) ENG	Marlon Pack	42	2	32+5	2	1+2	0	0+0	0	2+0	0
16	DF	(England) ENG	Curtis Nelson	36	2	31+2	1	0+0	0	1+0	0	2+0	1
17	FW	(England) ENG	Lee Tomlin	36	9	24+9	8	0+1	0	0+0	0	2+0	1
19	MF	(England) ENG	Nathaniel Mendez-Laing	29	3	21+6	3	0+0	0	0+0	0	2+0	0
20	MF	(Northern Ireland) NIR	Gavin Whyte	30	1	15+9	0	4+0	1	1+0	0	0+1	0
22	DF	(Ivory Coast) CIV	Sol Bamba	9	0	1+4	0	4+0	0	0+0	0	0+0	0
23	FW	(England) ENG	Danny Ward	33	8	7+21	7	3+0	1	0+0	0	1+1	0
24	DF	(Australia) AUS	Brad Smith	3	0	0+3	0	0+0	0	0+0	0	0+0	0
25	GK	(England) ENG	Joe Day	2	0	0+1	0	0+0	0	1+0	0	0+0	0
30	DF	(Northern Ireland) NIR	Ciaron Brown	1	0	0+0	0	0+0	0	1+0	0	0+0	0
31	MF	(Republic of Ireland) IRL	Aaron Bolger	0	0	0+0	0	0+0	0	0+0	0	0+0	0
33	MF	(Canada) CAN	Junior Hoilett	45	7	29+12	7	0+1	0	1+0	0	2+0	0
34	MF	(Wales) WAL	James Waite	1	0	0+0	0	0+0	0	0+1	0	0+0	0
39	DF	(England) ENG	Joel Bagan	1	0	0+0	0	1+0	0	0+0	0	0+0	0
40	MF	(England) ENG	Tom Sang	1	0	0+0	0	0+1	0	0+0	0	0+0	0
Players who left the club:
2	DF	(England) ENG	Lee Peltier	25	0	24+1	0	0+0	0	0+0	0	0+0	0
14	FW	(Jamaica) JAM	Bobby Decordova-Reid	1	0	1+0	0	0+0	0	0+0	0	0+0	0
14	FW	(Ghana) GHA	Albert Adomah	9	0	9+0	0	0+0	0	0+0	0	0+0	0
24	FW	(England) ENG	Gary Madine	9	0	5+3	0	0+0	0	0+1	0	0+0	0
21	DF	(Wales) WAL	Jazz Richards	14	0	11+1	0	2+0	0	0+0	0	0+0	0
27	FW	(England) ENG	Omar Bogle	12	1	2+9	1	0+0	0	1+0	0	0+0	0
32	DF	(Wales) WAL	Cameron Coxe	3	0	0+0	0	2+0	0	1+0	0	0+0	0
35	FW	(England) ENG	Shamar Moore	1	0	0+0	0	0+0	0	0+1	0	0+0	0

==== Goals record ====
As of 31 July 2020

Rank	No.	Nat.	Po.	Name	Championship	FA Cup	League Cup	Play-Offs	Total
1	17	(England)	SS	Lee Tomlin	8	0	0	1	9
2	9	(Germany)	CF	Robert Glatzel	7	1	0	0	8
2	11	(England)	LW	Josh Murphy	5	3	0	0	8
2	23	(England)	CF	Danny Ward	7	1	0	0	8
4	8	(England)	CM	Joe Ralls	7	0	0	0	7
4	13	(Scotland)	CM	Callum Paterson	5	2	0	0	7
4	33	(Canada)	LW	Junior Hoilett	7	0	0	0	7
9	4	(England)	CB	Sean Morrison	4	0	0	0	4
9	5	(England)	CB	Aden Flint	2	2	0	0	4
9	6	(Wales)	CM	Will Vaulks	4	0	0	0	4
12	19	(England)	RW	Nathaniel Mendez-Laing	3	0	0	0	3
13	15	(England)	CM	Marlon Pack	2	0	0	0	2
13	16	(England)	CB	Curtis Nelson	1	0	0	1	2
15	7	(Curaçao)	CM	Leandro Bacuna	1	0	0	0	1
15	10	(England)	CF	Isaac Vassell	1	0	0	0	1
15	20	(Northern Ireland)	RW	Gavin Whyte	0	1	0	0	1
15	27	(England)	CF	Omar Bogle	1	0	0	0	1
Own Goals					3	0	0	0	3
Total					66	10	0	2	78

==== Disciplinary record ====
As of 31 July 2020

Rank	No.	Nat.	Po.	Name	Championship			FA Cup			League Cup			Play-Offs			Total		
Rank	No.	Nat.	Po.	Name	Yellow card	(yellow card) (yellow-red card)	Red card	Yellow card	(yellow card) (yellow-red card)	Red card	Yellow card	(yellow card) (yellow-red card)	Red card	Yellow card	(yellow card) (yellow-red card)	Red card	Yellow card	(yellow card) (yellow-red card)	Red card
1	17	(England)	SS	Lee Tomlin	8	0	0	0	0	0	0	0	0	0	0	0	8	0	0
2	6	(Wales)	DM	Will Vaulks	3	0	0	2	0	0	1	0	0	1	0	0	7	0	0
2	7	(Curaçao)	CM	Leandro Bacuna	5	0	0	0	0	0	0	0	0	2	0	0	7	0	0
2	33	(Canada)	LW	Junior Hoilett	6	0	0	0	0	0	0	0	0	1	0	0	7	0	0
5	4	(England)	CB	Sean Morrison	4	0	1	0	0	0	0	0	0	1	0	0	5	0	1
5	8	(England)	CM	Joe Ralls	5	0	0	0	0	0	0	0	0	1	0	0	6	0	0
5	11	(England)	LW	Josh Murphy	4	0	0	2	0	0	0	0	0	0	0	0	6	0	0
8	3	(England)	LB	Joe Bennett	5	0	0	0	0	0	0	0	0	0	0	0	5	0	0
8	21	(Wales)	RB	Jazz Richards	4	0	0	1	0	0	0	0	0	0	0	0	5	0	0
10	15	(England)	CM	Marlon Pack	4	0	0	0	0	0	0	0	0	0	0	0	4	0	0
10	~~2~~	(England)	RB	Lee Peltier	3	0	0	0	0	0	0	0	0	0	0	0	3	0	0
10	16	(England)	CB	Curtis Nelson	3	0	0	0	0	0	0	0	0	0	0	0	3	0	0
12	2	(England)	RB	Dion Sanderson	2	0	0	0	0	0	0	0	0	0	0	0	2	0	0
12	5	(England)	CB	Aden Flint	2	0	0	0	0	0	0	0	0	0	0	0	2	0	0
12	13	(Scotland)	CM	Callum Paterson	2	0	0	0	0	0	0	0	0	0	0	0	2	0	0
12	~~14~~	(Ghana)	RW	Albert Adomah	2	0	0	0	0	0	0	0	0	0	0	0	2	0	0
12	20	(Northern Ireland)	RW	Gavin Whyte	1	0	0	1	0	0	0	0	0	0	0	0	2	0	0
12	~~24~~	(England)	CF	Gary Madine	2	0	0	0	0	0	0	0	0	0	0	0	2	0	0
19	9	(Germany)	CF	Robert Glatzel	1	0	0	0	0	0	0	0	0	0	0	0	1	0	0
19	12	(England)	GK	Alex Smithies	1	0	0	0	0	0	0	0	0	0	0	0	1	0	0
19	~~14~~	(Jamaica)	CF	Bobby Decordova-Reid	1	0	0	0	0	0	0	0	0	0	0	0	1	0	0
19	23	(England)	CF	Danny Ward	0	0	1	0	0	0	0	0	0	0	0	0	0	0	1
19	~~27~~	(England)	CF	Omar Bogle	1	0	0	0	0	0	0	0	0	0	0	0	1	0	0
Total					69	0	2	6	0	0	1	0	0	6	0	0	82	0	2

=== Contracts ===
Date	Position	Nationality	Name	Status	Contract Length	Expiry Date	Ref.
13 December 2019	CB	(Ivory Coast)	Sol Bamba	Signed	1 year	June 2021	
10 January 2020	SS	(England)	Lee Tomlin	Signed	2 years	June 2022	
25 June 2020	CF	(England)	Danny Ward	Signed	2 Months	August 2020	

== Transfers ==
=== Transfers in ===
Date	Position	Nationality	Name	From	Fee	Ref.
1 July 2019	GK	(England)	Joe Day	(Wales) Newport County	Free transfer	
1 July 2019	CB	(England)	Curtis Nelson	(England) Oxford United	Free transfer	
1 July 2019	DM	(Wales)	Will Vaulks	(England) Rotherham United	Undisclosed (Note: Fee reported to be an initial £2,100,000 with further add ons)	
2 July 2019	CM	(Republic of Ireland)	Aaron Bolger	(Republic of Ireland) Shamrock Rovers	Undisclosed	
19 July 2019	CB	(England)	Aden Flint	(England) Middlesbrough	Undisclosed (Note: Fee reported to be an initial £4,000,000 with further add ons)	
30 July 2019	RW	(Northern Ireland)	Gavin Whyte	(England) Oxford United	Undisclosed (Note: Fee reported to be £2,000,000)	
31 July 2019	CF	(Germany)	Robert Glatzel	(Germany) FC Heidenheim	Undisclosed (Note: Fee reported to be £5,500,000)	
8 August 2019	CM	(England)	Marlon Pack	(England) Bristol City	Undisclosed (Note: Fee reported to be £4,000,000)	
8 August 2019	CF	(England)	Isaac Vassell	(England) Birmingham City	Undisclosed	
27 August 2019	GK	(Republic of Ireland)	Brian Murphy	Free Agent	Free	
7 November 2019	LB	(Senegal)	Armand Traoré	(Turkey) Çaykur Rizespor	Free	

- Spent ▼ - Undisclosed (~ £17,600,000)

=== Loans in ===
Date from	Position	Nationality	Name	From	Date until	Ref.
30 January 2020	LB	(Australia)	Brad Smith	(England) Bournemouth	30 June 2020	
31 January 2020	LW	(Ghana)	Albert Adomah	(England) Nottingham Forest	30 June 2020	
31 January 2020	RB	(England)	Dion Sanderson	(England) Wolverhampton Wanderers	30 June 2020	

=== Loans out ===
Date from	Position	Nationality	Name	To	Date until	Ref.
1 July 2019	LW	(Wales)	Mark Harris	(Wales) Wrexham	30 June 2020	
24 July 2019	RB	(Wales)	Connor Davies	(England) Weston-super-Mare	30 June 2020	
8 August 2019	LB	(Republic of Ireland)	Greg Cunningham	(England) Blackburn Rovers	30 June 2020	
8 August 2019	CF	(Jamaica)	Bobby Reid	(England) Fulham	24 January 2020	
16 August 2019	LB	(England)	Daniel Martin	(England) Weston-super-Mare	February 2020	
13 September 2019	CB	(Wales)	Jack Bodenham	(England) Hereford	1 January 2020	
8 January 2019	CB	(Northern Ireland)	Ciaron Brown	(Scotland) Livingston	30 June 2020	
28 January 2020	GK	(England)	Joe Day	(England) AFC Wimbledon	30 June 2020	
31 January 2020	CF	(England)	Omar Bogle	(Netherlands) ADO Den Haag	11 May 2020	
14 February 2020	LB	(England)	Joel Bagan	(England) Notts County	March 2020	

=== Transfers out ===
Date	Position	Nationality	Name	To	Fee	Ref.
1 July 2019	GK	(England)	Jordan Duffey	Free agent	Released	
1 July 2019	MF	(Republic of Ireland)	Tyrone Duffus	(England) Warrington Town	Released	
1 July 2019	CM	(Iceland)	Aron Gunnarsson	(Qatar) Al-Arabi	Free transfer	
1 July 2019	RM	(England)	Kadeem Harris	(England) Sheffield Wednesday	Released	
1 July 2019	CF	(Scotland)	Jack McKay	(England) Chesterfield	Free transfer	
1 July 2019	GK	(Republic of Ireland)	Brian Murphy	Free Agent	Free	
1 July 2019	CM	(England)	Stuart O'Keefe	(England) Gillingham	Released	
1 July 2019	CB	(Wales)	Adam Sharif	Free agent	Released	
1 July 2019	AM	(England)	Henry Smith	Free agent	Released	
16 July 2019	CF	(England)	Rhys Healey	(England) Milton Keynes Dons	Undisclosed	
19 July 2019	CB	(Gabon)	Bruno Ecuele Manga	(France) Dijon	Undisclosed (Note: Fee reported to be £3,000,000)	
19 July 2019	CF	(Denmark)	Kenneth Zohore	(England) West Bromwich Albion	Undisclosed (Note: Fee reported to be £8,000,000)	
9 August 2019	CM	(France)	Loïc Damour	(Scotland) Heart of Midlothian	Undisclosed	
7 January 2020	LB	(Senegal)	Armand Traoré	Free agent	Released	
9 January 2020	CF	(England)	Gary Madine	(England) Blackpool	Mutual consent	
24 January 2020	AM	(Jamaica)	Bobby Decordova-Reid	(England) Fulham	Undisclosed	
31 January 2020	RB	(England)	Lee Peltier	(England) West Bromwich Albion	Free Transfer	
12 February 2020	GK	(Republic of Ireland)	Brian Murphy	(Republic of Ireland) Waterford	Free Transfer	
30 June 2020	CF	(England)	Omar Bogle	Free Agent	Released	
30 June 2020	GK	(England)	Warren Burwood	Free Agent	Released	
30 June 2020	CB	(England)	Matthew Connolly	Free Agent	Released	
30 June 2020	RB	(Wales)	Cameron Coxe	Free Agent	Released	
30 June 2020	RB	(Wales)	Connor Davies	Free Agent	Released	
30 June 2020	CM	(England)	Jacob Evans	Free Agent	Released	
30 June 2020	LM	(Wales)	Lloyd Humphries	Free Agent	Released	
30 June 2020	CB	(Wales)	Trystan Jones	Free Agent	Released	
30 June 2020	CF	(England)	Shamar Moore	Free Agent	Released	
30 June 2020	CB	(Wales)	Ryan Pryce	Free Agent	Released	
30 June 2020	RB	(Wales)	Jazz Richards	Free Agent	Released	
30 June 2020	CM	(Wales)	Sion Spence	Free Agent	Released	
30 June 2020	CM	(England)	Laurence Wootton	Free Agent	Released	

- Income ▲: Undisclosed (~ £11,000,000)

== Pre-season ==
The Bluebirds announced pre-season fixtures against Taff's Well, San Antonio, New Mexico United, Real Valladolid and OGC Nice.

5 July 2019 Friendly	Taff's Well	1–5	Cardiff City	Taff's Well
17:00 BST	French 21'	Report	Evans 16' (pen.); Wootton 19'; Griffiths 66'; Mayembe 72'; Davies 88'	Stadium: Rhiw'r Ddar

13 July 2019 Friendly	San Antonio FC	0–1	Cardiff City	San Antonio, Texas, U.S.
19:00 CDT		Report	Murphy 56' (pen.)	Stadium: Toyota Field

18 July 2019 Friendly	New Mexico United	1–1	Cardiff City	Albuquerque, New Mexico, U.S.
20:45 MDT	Akamatsu 3'	Report	Bogle 63'	Stadium: UNM Soccer Stadium

20 July 2019 Friendly	Real Valladolid	1–1 (2–4 p)	Cardiff City	Edmonton, Alberta, Canada
20:30 MDT	Barba 60'	Report	Bogle 41'

27 July 2019 Friendly	Cardiff City	1–0	OGC Nice	Cardiff
15:00 BST	Ralls 1'	Report		Stadium: Cardiff City Stadium

== Competitions ==
=== League table ===
Pos	Team	Pld	W	D	L	GF	GA	GD	Pts	Promotion, qualification or relegation
2	West Bromwich Albion (P)	46	22	17	7	77	45	+32	83	Promotion to the Premier League
3	Brentford	46	24	9	13	80	38	+42	81	Qualification for Championship play-offs (Note: Four teams play for one spot and promotion to the Premier League.)
4	Fulham (O, P)	46	23	12	11	64	48	+16	81	Qualification for Championship play-offs
5	Cardiff City	46	19	16	11	68	58	+10	73	Qualification for Championship play-offs
6	Swansea City	46	18	16	12	62	53	+9	70	Qualification for Championship play-offs
7	Nottingham Forest	46	18	16	12	58	50	+8	70	
8	Millwall	46	17	17	12	57	51	+6	68	

Source: EFL Official Website
Rules for classification: 1) Points; 2) Goal difference; 3) Number of goals scored; 4) Head-to-head results; 5) Wins; 6) Away goals; 7) Penalty points (sec 9.5); 8) 12-point sending off offences
(O) Play-off winners; (P) Promoted

==== Results summary ====
Overall								Home						Away					
Pld	W	D	L	GF	GA	GD	Pts	W	D	L	GF	GA	GD	W	D	L	GF	GA	GD
46	19	16	11	68	58	+10	73	11	9	3	35	21	+14	8	7	8	33	37	−4

Last updated: 22 July 2020.

==== Results by matchday ====
Matchday	1	2	3	4	5	6	7	8	9	10	11	12	13	14	15	16	17	18	19	20	21	22	23	24	25	26	27	28	29	30	31	32	33	34	35	36	37	38	39	40	41	42	43	44	45	46
Ground	A	H	A	H	A	H	A	H	A	H	A	H	A	A	H	H	A	H	A	H	A	A	H	H	A	A	H	A	H	H	A	A	H	A	H	H	A	H	A	H	A	H	A	H	A	H
Result	L	W	L	W	D	D	D	W	D	W	L	D	D	L	W	L	D	W	W	W	L	D	D	D	W	L	D	D	W	D	W	W	D	L	L	D	W	W	W	D	W	L	L	W	W	W
Position	14	12	19	12	14	13	14	13	12	10	11	11	13	14	14	14	16	10	10	8	9	12	12	11	10	12	12	13	12	11	8	8	9	10	10	11	9	7	6	6	6	6	6	6	6	5

Updated to match(es) played on 22 July 2020. Source: Statto.com
A = Away; H = Home; W = Win; D = Draw; L = Loss

==== Matches ====
On Thursday, 20 June 2019, the EFL Championship fixtures were revealed.

3 August 2019 1	Wigan Athletic	3–2	Cardiff City	Wigan
15:00 BST	Windass (penalty missed) 49' 63'; Jacobs 59'; Garner (yellow card) 66'; Evans 75'; Byrne (yellow card) 90+1'	Report	Ralls (yellow card) 7' (goal) 20'; Reid (yellow card) 44'; Murphy (yellow card) 45+1'; Flint (yellow card) 66'; Bogle 70'	Stadium: DW Stadium; Attendance: 12,169; Referee: David Webb (Lancashire)

10 August 2019 2	Cardiff City	2–1	Luton Town	Cardiff
15:00 BST	Murphy (yellow card) 21'; Paterson (yellow card) 45+1'; Flint 52'; Vassell 90+6'	Report	Collins (yellow card) 61'; Pearson 86'; Potts (yellow card) 90+5'	Stadium: Cardiff City Stadium; Attendance: 24,724; Referee: Darren Bond (Lancashire)

18 August 2019 3	Reading	3–0	Cardiff City	Reading
12:00 BST	Pușcaș 25', 40'; Moore (yellow card) 42'; Swift 83'; Méïté (penalty missed) 90+1'	Report	Bacuna (yellow card) 8'; Ralls (yellow card) 45'	Stadium: Madjeski Stadium; Attendance: 14252; Referee: Andy Davies (Hampshire)
Note: Live on Sky Sports

21 August 2019 4	Cardiff City	2–1	Huddersfield Town	Cardiff
19:45 BST	Ralls 42'; Bennett (yellow card) 56'; Hoilett 88'	Report	Chalobah 50'; Elphick (yellow card) 80'	Stadium: Cardiff City Stadium; Attendance: 21,821; Referee: Jarred Gillett (Australia & Lancashire)

24 August 2019 5	Blackburn Rovers	0–0	Cardiff City	Blackburn
15:00 BST	Bennett (yellow card) 33'	Report	Tomlin (yellow card) 55'; Bogle (yellow card) 72'; Bennett (yellow card) 86'	Stadium: Ewood Park; Attendance: 13,291; Referee: David Coote (Nottinghamshire)

30 August 2019 6	Cardiff City	1–1	Fulham	Cardiff
19:45 BST	Murphy 42'; Bacuna (yellow card) 80'	Report	Mitrović 45'; Arter (yellow card) 66' (yellow-red card) 68'; Bettinelli (yellow card) 72'; Mawson (yellow card) 85'; Cairney (yellow card) 89'	Stadium: Cardiff City Stadium; Attendance: 22,631; Referee: Tim Robinson (West Sussex)
Note: Live on Sky Sports

13 September 2019 7	Derby County	1–1	Cardiff City	Derby
19:45 BST	Malone 6'; Keogh (yellow card) 18'; Lawrence (yellow card) 88'	Sky; BBC	Glatzel 19' (pen.); Peltier (yellow card) 40'; Flint (yellow card) 90+7'	Stadium: Pride Park Stadium; Attendance: 25,873; Referee: Darren England (Barnsley)
Note: Live on Sky Sports

21 September 2019 8	Cardiff City	1–0	Middlesbrough	Cardiff
15:00 BST	Fletcher 2' (o.g.); Ralls (yellow card) 87'	Report	Johnson (yellow card) 77'; Ayala (yellow card) 79'	Stadium: Cardiff City Stadium; Attendance: 23,141; Referee: Darren Bond (Lancashire)

28 September 2019 9	Hull City	2–2	Cardiff City	Kingston upon Hull
15:00 BST	Stewart (yellow card) 23'; Grosicki 44' de Wijs 89'; Burke (yellow card) 90+4'	Report	Glatzel 55'; Ward 90+2'	Stadium: KC Stadium; Attendance: 10,756; Referee: Jarred Gillett (Australia & Lancashire)

2 October 2019 10	Cardiff City	3–0	Queens Park Rangers	Cardiff
19:45 BST	Morrison 11'; Pack 45+1'; Paterson 72', (yellow card) 84'; Whyte (yellow card) 87'	Report	Manning (yellow card) 84'	Stadium: Cardiff City Stadium; Attendance: 21,387; Referee: Matt Donohue (Manchester)

5 October 2019 11	West Bromwich Albion	4–2	Cardiff City	West Bromwich
15:00 BST	Pereira 20'; Livermore (yellow card) 32'; Diangana 42'; Austin 71'; Sawyers 90+3'	Report	Ward 75', 86'; Pack (yellow card) 88'	Stadium: The Hawthorns; Attendance: 25,140; Referee: John Brooks (Leicestershire and Rutland)

18 October 2019 12	Cardiff City	1–1	Sheffield Wednesday	Cardiff
19:45 BST	Tomlin 87'	Report	Börner 19'; Hutchinson (yellow card) 38'; Palmer (yellow card) 64'; Fox (yellow card) 90+1'	Stadium: Cardiff City Stadium; Attendance: 22,486; Referee: Keith Stroud (Bournemouth)
Note: Live on Sky Sports

22 October 2019 13	Millwall	2–2	Cardiff City	London
19:45 BST	Bradshaw 45', 77'; Cooper (yellow card) 77'	Report	Ward 12'; Hoilett 57'; Bennett (yellow card) 65'	Stadium: The Den; Attendance: 11,769; Referee: Tim Robinson (West Sussex)

27 October 2019 14	Swansea City	1–0	Cardiff City	Swansea
12:00 GMT	Wilmot 24'	Report	Ralls (yellow card) 85'	Stadium: Liberty Stadium; Attendance: 20,270; Referee: Robert Jones (Merseyside)
Note: Live on Sky Sports; South Wales Derby

2 November 2019 15	Cardiff City	4–2	Birmingham City	Cardiff
15:00 GMT	Ralls 30' (pen.), 69', 90+5' (pen.); Nelson 38'; Ward (red card) 52'; Peltier (yellow card) 90+3'	Report	Pedersen 3'; Šunjić (yellow card) 32', (goal) 89'; Jutkiewicz (yellow card) 85'; Dean (red card) 90+3'; Roberts (yellow card) 90+5'	Stadium: Cardiff City Stadium; Attendance: 23,778; Referee: Andrew Madley (Yorkshire)

10 November 2019 16	Cardiff City	0–1	Bristol City	Cardiff
12:00 GMT	Pack (yellow card) 19'	Report	Nagy (yellow card) 27'; Rowe (yellow card) 53'; Brownhill 67'	Stadium: Cardiff City Stadium; Attendance: 23,846; Referee: Tony Harrington (Cleveland)
Note: Live on Sky Sports; Severnside Derby

23 November 2019 17	Charlton Athletic	2–2	Cardiff City	Charlton
12:30 GMT	Gallagher 13'; Leko 42'; Bonne (yellow card) 90+5'	Report	Mendez-Laing 52'; Madine (yellow card) 58'; Tomlin 73', (yellow card) 85'; Peltier (yellow card) 82'	Stadium: The Valley; Attendance: 16,011; Referee: Darren Bond (Lancashire)
Note: Live on Sky Sports

26 November 2019 18	Cardiff City	1–0	Stoke City	Cardiff
19:45 GMT	Bacuna 11'; Tomlin (yellow card) 81'	Report	Woods (yellow card) 61'	Stadium: Cardiff City Stadium; Attendance: 20,884; Referee: Gavin Ward (Surrey)

30 November 2019 19	Nottingham Forest	0–1	Cardiff City	West Bridgford
15:00 GMT		Report	Mendez-Laing 14'; Madine (yellow card) 67'	Stadium: City Ground; Attendance: 28,209; Referee: Robert Jones (Merseyside)

7 December 2019 20	Cardiff City	3–2	Barnsley	Cardiff
15:00 GMT	Diaby 20' (o.g.); Ward 67'; Tomlin (yellow card) 80', (goal) 90+4'	Report	Chaplin 17'; Halme (yellow card) 40'; Peltier 48' (o.g.); Bähre (yellow card) 62'; Andersen (yellow card) 80'; B Williams (yellow card) 90+1'; Mowatt (yellow card) 90+5'	Stadium: Cardiff City Stadium; Attendance: 21,380; Referee: Paul Tierney (Lancashire)

11 December 2019 21	Brentford	2–1	Cardiff City	Brentford
19:45 GMT	Mbeumo 25'; Watkins 46'; Jansson (yellow card) 76'; Henry (yellow card) 80'	Report	Pack 64'; Murphy (yellow card) 70'; Bennett (yellow card) 83'	Stadium: Griffin Park; Attendance: 10,417; Referee: John Brooks (Leicestershire)

14 December 2019 22	Leeds United	3–3	Cardiff City	Leeds
15:00 GMT	Costa 6'; Bamford 8', 52' (pen.); Hernández (yellow card) 45+1'	Report	Tomlin (yellow card) 32', (goal) 60'; Morrison 82', (red card) 86'; Glatzel 88'	Stadium: Elland Road; Attendance: 34,552; Referee: Tony Harrington (Cleveland)

21 December 2019 23	Cardiff City	0–0	Preston North End	Cardiff
12:30 GMT	Tomlin (yellow card) 45+1'	Report	Gallagher (yellow card) 21'; Clarke (yellow card) 35'	Stadium: Cardiff City Stadium; Attendance: 22,625; Referee: Jeremy Simpson (Lancashire)
Note: Live on Sky Sports

26 December 2019 24	Cardiff City	1–1	Millwall	Cardiff
15:00 GMT	Flint 59'; Hoilett (yellow card) 81'	Report	J Wallace 63'	Stadium: Cardiff City Stadium; Attendance: 23,583; Referee: David Webb (County Durham)

29 December 2019 25	Sheffield Wednesday	1–2	Cardiff City	Sheffield
15:00 GMT	Lees 18'; Harris (yellow card) 51'	Report	Glatzel 5'; Hoilett 8'; Hoilett (yellow card) 61'; Richards (yellow card) 67'	Stadium: Hillsborough; Attendance: Tim Robinson (West Sussex); Referee: 25,385

1 January 2020 26	Queens Park Rangers	6–1	Cardiff City	London
15:00 GMT	Wells 9', 48', 64'; Osayi-Samuel 27', 41'; Leistner (yellow card) 39'; Eze 57'; Amos (yellow card) 86'	Report	Tomlin (yellow card) 32'; Vaulks 90+1'	Stadium: Loftus Road; Attendance: 12,355; Referee: Darren England (Barnsley)

12 January 2020 27	Cardiff City	0–0	Swansea City	Cardiff
12:00 GMT	Hoilett (yellow card) 30'; Glatzel (yellow card) 34'; Pack (yellow card) 63'; Bennett (yellow card) 72'	Report	Brewster (yellow card) 11'; Cabango (yellow card) 34'	Stadium: Cardiff City Stadium; Attendance: 28,529; Referee: Tony Harrington (Cleveland)
Note: Live on Sky Sports; South Wales Derby

18 January 2020 28	Birmingham City	1–1	Cardiff City	Birmingham
15:00 GMT	Bellingham 4'; Gardner (yellow card) 84'	Report	Tomlin (yellow card) 61', (goal) 63'; Richards (yellow card) 68'; Pack (yellow card) 74'	Stadium: St Andrew's; Attendance: 20,842; Referee: Andy Davies (Hampshire)

28 January 2020 29	Cardiff City	2–1	West Bromwich Albion	Cardiff
19:45 GMT	Paterson 46'; Nelson (yellow card) 65'; Tomlin 76'	Report	Austin 61' (pen.)	Stadium: Cardiff City Stadium; Attendance: 22,516; Referee: Robert Jones (Cheshire)

31 January 2020 30	Cardiff City	1–1	Reading	Cardiff
19:45 GMT	Richards (yellow card) 56'; Paterson 70'; Nelson (yellow card) 88'; Morrison (yellow card) 90'	Report	Méïté 8'; Baldock (yellow card) 45+1'; Obita (yellow card) 56'	Stadium: Cardiff City Stadium; Attendance: 22,518; Referee: Simon Hooper (Wiltshire)

8 February 2020 31	Luton Town	0–1	Cardiff City	Luton
15:00 GMT		Report	Tomlin 73'; Morrison (yellow card) 77'	Stadium: Kenilworth Road; Attendance: 10,041; Referee: James Linington (Isle of Wight)

12 February 2020 32	Huddersfield Town	0–3	Cardiff City	Huddersfield
19:45 GMT	Stearman (yellow card) 44'	Report	Nelson (yellow card) 18'; Murphy 28'; Vaulks 33' (yellow card) 66'; Paterson 69'	Stadium: John Smith's Stadium; Attendance: 20,238; Referee: Darren England (Barnsley)

15 February 2020 33	Cardiff City	2–2	Wigan Athletic	Cardiff
15:00 GMT	Murphy 8', (yellow card) 25'; Naismith 55' (o.g.); Morrison (yellow card) 75'; Vaulks (yellow card) 80'	Report	Evans (yellow card) 1'; Moore 5', 45+4' (pen.); Williams (yellow card) 31'; Gelhardt (yellow card) 82'	Stadium: Cardiff City Stadium; Attendance: 21,287; Referee: John Brooks (Leicestershire and Rutland)

22 February 2020 34	Stoke City	2–0	Cardiff City	Stoke-on-Trent
15:00 GMT	Paterson 25' (o.g.); Allen 72'; Powell (yellow card) 78'	Report	Richards (yellow card) 87'	Stadium: bet365 Stadium; Attendance: 25,436; Referee: Dean Whitestone (Northamptonshire)

25 February 2020 35	Cardiff City	0–1	Nottingham Forest	Cardiff
19:45 GMT	Bacuna (yellow card) 82'	Report	Silva 49'; Ameobi (yellow card) 70'; Worrall (yellow card) 84'	Stadium: Cardiff City Stadium; Attendance: 21,273; Referee: Stephen Martin (Staffordshire)
Note: Live on Sky Sports

29 February 2020 36	Cardiff City	2–2	Brentford	Cardiff
15:00 GMT	Adomah (yellow card) 23'; Hoilett 34', (yellow card) 75'; Ralls 45+1'; Bacuna (yellow card) 52'; Vaulks (yellow card) 81'	Report	Racic 5'; Mbeumo 21'; Baptiste (yellow card) 85'	Stadium: Cardiff City Stadium; Attendance: 22,393; Referee: Simon Hooper (Wiltshire)

7 March 2020 37	Barnsley	0–2	Cardiff City	Barnsley
15:00 GMT		Report	Vaulks 65'; Paterson 66'	Stadium: Oakwell; Attendance: 12,751; Referee: James Linington (Isle of Wight)

21 June 2020 38	Cardiff City	2–0	Leeds United	Cardiff
12:00 BST	Hoilett 35', (yellow card) 43'; Adomah (yellow card) 42'; Glatzel 71'	Report	Costa (yellow card) 37'; Phillips (yellow card) 45+2'; Roberts (yellow card) 57'; Klich (yellow card) 81'	Stadium: Cardiff City Stadium; Referee: Andy Woolmer (Northants)
Note: Postponed due to the COVID-19 pandemic The match was rescheduled to 21 June. Live on Sky Sports.

27 June 2020 39	Preston North End	1–3	Cardiff City	Preston
12:30 BST	Davies (yellow card) 67'; Johnson 73'	Report	Sanderson (yellow card) 54'; Ralls 69'; Mendez-Laing 82'; Smithies (yellow card) 90'; Glatzel 90+1'	Stadium: Deepdale; Referee: Oliver Langford (West Midlands)
Note: Postponed due to the COVID-19 pandemic The match was rescheduled to 27 June. Live on Sky Sports.

30 June 2020 40	Cardiff City	0–0	Charlton Athletic	Cardiff
18:00 BST	Sanderson (yellow card) 74'	Report	Purrington (yellow card) 83'	Stadium: Cardiff City Stadium; Referee: Stephen Martin (Staffordshire)
Note: Postponed due to the COVID-19 pandemic The match was rescheduled to 30 June.

4 July 2020 41	Bristol City	0–1	Cardiff City	Ashton Gate
15:00 BST	Smith (yellow card) 23'	Report	Ward 85'	Stadium: Ashton Gate Stadium; Referee: Tim Robinson (West Sussex)
Note: On 3 April, the English Football League decided to postpone all football until safe to do so due to the COVID-19 pandemic. The match was rescheduled to 4 July. Live on Sky Sports.

7 July 2020 42	Cardiff City	2–3	Blackburn Rovers	Cardiff
19:45 BST	Vaulks 14'; Glatzel 41'	Report	Graham 22'; Samuel 46'; Armstrong 70'; Travis (yellow card) 88'	Stadium: Cardiff City Stadium; Referee: Matt Donohue (Manchester)
Note: On 3 April, the English Football League decided to postpone all football until safe to do so due to the COVID-19 pandemic. The match was rescheduled to 7 July.

10 July 2020 43	Fulham	2–0	Cardiff City	Fulham
20:15 BST	Mitrović 35' (pen.); Knockaert (yellow card) 39'; Hector (yellow card) 58'; Onomah 66'; Christie (yellow card) 77'	Report	Ralls (yellow card) 81'	Stadium: Craven Cottage; Referee: Gavin Ward (Surrey)
Note: On 3 April, the English Football League decided to postpone all football until safe to do so due to the COVID-19. The match was rescheduled to 10 July. Live on Sky Sports

14 July 2020 44	Cardiff City	2–1	Derby County	Cardiff
19:45 BST	Hoilett 17', (yellow card) 62'; Tomlin 59'	Report	Knight 30'	Stadium: Cardiff City Stadium; Referee: Darren Bond (Lancashire)
Note: On 3 April, the English Football League decided to postpone all football until safe to do so due to the COVID-19 pandemic. The match was rescheduled to 14 July.

18 July 2020 45	Middlesbrough	1–3	Cardiff City	Middlesbrough
15:00 BST	Saville (yellow card) 1'; Friend (yellow card) 19'; Howson (yellow card) 77' (yellow-red card) 89'; Assombalonga 85'	Report	Morrison 4', (yellow card) 84'; Murphy 47', 81'; Bacuna (yellow card) 90'	Stadium: Riverside Stadium; Referee: Jeremy Simpson (Lancashire)
Note: On 3 April, the English Football League decided to postpone all football until safe to do so due to the COVID-19 pandemic. The match was rescheduled to 18 July.

22 July 2020 46	Cardiff City	3–0	Hull City	Cardiff
19:30 BST	Hoilett 20'; Morrison 34'; Ward 83'	Report		Stadium: Cardiff City Stadium; Referee: James Linington (Isle of Wight)
Note: On 3 April, the English Football League decided to postpone all football until safe to do so due to the COVID-19 pandemic. The match was rescheduled to 22 July.

==== Play-Offs ====
27 July 2020 Semi-Final 1st Leg	Cardiff City	0–2	Fulham	Cardiff
19:45 BST	Hoilett (yellow card) 45'; Bacuna (yellow card) 77'	Report	Onomah 49'; Kebano 90+1'	Stadium: Cardiff City Stadium; Referee: Geoff Eltringham (Sunderland)

30 July 2020 Semi-Final 2nd Leg	Fulham	1–2 (3–2 agg.)	Cardiff City	London
19:45 BST	Kebano 9'; Reid (yellow card) 50'; Rodák (yellow card) 59'; Christie (yellow card) 69'; Onomah (yellow card) 90+3'	Report	Nelson 8'; Morrison (yellow card) 35'; Bacuna (yellow card) 45+2'; Tomlin 47'; Vaulks (yellow card) 52'; Ralls (yellow card) 62'	Stadium: Craven Cottage; Referee: Paul Tierney (Lancashire)

=== FA Cup ===
The second round draw was made live on BBC Two from Etihad Stadium, Micah Richards and Tony Adams conducted the draw.

4 January 2020 Third round	Cardiff City	2–2	Carlisle United	Cardiff
15:00 GMT	Paterson 50'; Whyte 55'; Vaulks (yellow card) 86'	Report	Bridge 12'; Hope (yellow card) 40'; McKirdy 45+2'	Stadium: Cardiff City Stadium; Attendance: 5,282; Referee: Geoff Eltringham (Sunderland)

15 January 2020 Third round replay	Carlisle United	3–4	Cardiff City	Carlisle
19:45 GMT	Thomas 7'; McKirdy (yellow card) 24', (goal) 51', 64'	Report	Flint 18', 48'; Murphy 45', (yellow card) 90+4'; Ward 57'	Stadium: Brunton Park; Attendance: 4,381; Referee: Darren Handley

25 January 2020 Fourth round	Reading	1–1	Cardiff City	Reading
15:00 GMT	Méïté 8', (yellow card) 9'; McIntyre (yellow card) 45+1' (yellow-red card) 81'; Howe (yellow card) 90+1'	Report	Paterson 5'	Stadium: Madejski Stadium; Attendance: 12,798; Referee: Marc Edwards

4 February 2020 Fourth round replay	Cardiff City	3–3 (a.e.t.) (1–4 p)	Reading	Cardiff
19:45 GMT	Murphy 19', 93', (yellow card) 87'; Vaulks (yellow card) 39'; Glatzel 54'; Richards (yellow card) 66'; Ward (yellow card) 75'	Report	Richards 69', (yellow card) 87'; Rinomhota 79', (yellow card) 99'; Osho (yellow card) 81'; Méïté 116'	Stadium: Cardiff City Stadium; Attendance: 4,832; Referee: Gavin Ward
	Penalties
	Flint (penalty missed); Vaulks (penalty missed); Pack (penalty scored)		(penalty scored) McCleary; (penalty scored) Osho; (penalty scored) Obita; (penalty scored) Aluko

=== EFL Cup ===
The second round draw was made on 13 August 2019 following the conclusion of all but one first-round matches.

27 August 2019 Second round	Cardiff City	0–3	Luton Town	Cardiff
19:45 BST	Vaulks (yellow card) 85'	Report	Hoilett 43' (o.g.); Sheehan 63'; Jervis 70'	Stadium: Cardiff City Stadium; Attendance: 4111; Referee: Tony Harrington

== Summary ==
Games played	53 (46 EFL Championship, 4 FA Cup, 1 League Cup, 2 Play-Offs)
Games won	21 (19 EFL Championship, 1 FA Cup, 0 League Cup, 1 Play-Offs)
Games drawn	19 (16 EFL Championship, 3 FA Cup, 0 League Cup, 0 Play-Offs)
Games lost	13 (11 EFL Championship, 0 FA Cup, 1 League Cup, 1 Play-Offs)
Goals scored	78 (66 EFL Championship, 10 FA Cup, 0 League Cup, 2 Play-Offs)
Goals conceded	73 (58 EFL Championship, 9 FA Cup, 3 League Cup, 3 Play-Offs)
Goal difference	+5
Clean sheets	14 (14 EFL Championship, 0 FA Cup, 0 League Cup, 0 Play-Offs)
Yellow cards	82 (69 EFL Championship, 6 FA Cup, 1 League Cup, 6 Play-Offs)
Red cards	2 (2 EFL Championship, 0 FA Cup, 0 League Cup, 0 Play-Offs)
Worst Discipline	(England) Lee Tomlin (8 (yellow card) , 0 (yellow card) (yellow-red card) , 0 (red card) )
Best result	3–0 vs. Queens Park Rangers (2 Oct 19); 3–0 vs. Huddersfield Town (12 Feb 20); 3–0 vs. Hull City (22 Jul 20)
Worst result	1–6 vs. Queens Park Rangers (1 Jan 20)
Most appearances	(England) Joe Bennett (46 starts, 2 subs)
Top scorer	(England) Lee Tomlin (9)
Most Clean Sheets	(England) Alex Smithies (11)
Points	73

== Club staff ==
=== Backroom staff ===
Position	Name
Manager	(England) Neil Harris
Assistant manager	(England) David Livermore
First-team coach	(Wales) James Rowberry
Goalkeeper coach	(Wales) Andy Dibble
Head of medical services	(England) Paul Godfrey
Club doctor	(Wales) Dr. Len Nokes
First-team physiotherapist	(Wales) James Rowland
Head of Fitness & Conditioning	(England) Lee Southernwood
Senior Strength & Conditioning	(Wales) Mike Beere
Sports scientist	(Wales) Ben Parry
Head scout	(England) Glyn Chamberlain
First Team Analyst	(Wales) Jack Radusin
Player Liaison Officer	(Wales) Callum Davies
Kit and Equipment Manager	(Wales) Paul Carter

=== Board of directors ===
Position	Name
Chairman	(Cyprus) Mehmet Dalman
General Manager	(Malaysia) Ken Choo
Finance Director	(Wales) Richard Thompson
Non-Executive; Board Members; Football Club	(Wales) Steve Borley (since 2003) (Malaysia) Derek Chee Seng Chin (since 2010) (Malaysia) Veh Ken Choo (since 2016) (Cyprus) Mehmet Dalman (since 2012)
Non-Executive; Board Members; Cardiff City (Holdings)	(Malaysia) Danni Rais (since 2012)
Club Secretary	(England) David Beeby
