= Isaiah Jones (footballer, born 1999) =

Guyanese footballer (born 1999)

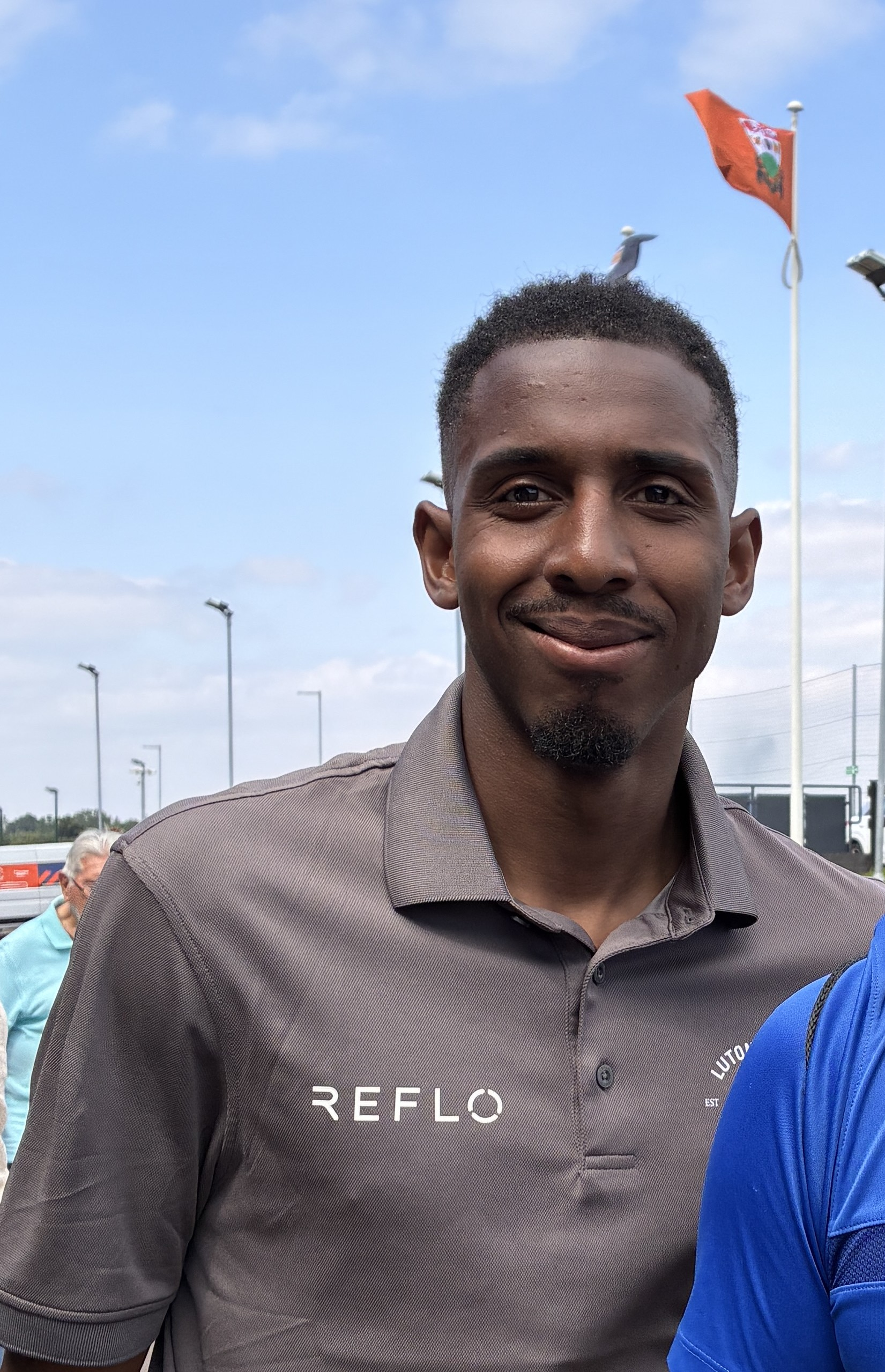
- Jones in 2026

Personal information
- Full name: Isaiah Benjamin Montell Jones
- Date of birth: 26 June 1999 (age 27)
- Place of birth: Lambeth, England
- Height: 1.81 m (5 ft 11 in)
- Positions: Right-back; wing-back; winger; midfielder

Team information
- Current team: Luton Town
- Number: 25

Senior career*
Years	Team	Apps	(Gls)
2017–2019	Tooting & Mitcham United	55	(10)
2019–2025	Middlesbrough	132	(12)
2019–2020	→ St Johnstone (loan)	0	(0)
2021	→ Queen of the South (loan)	11	(1)
2025–	Luton Town	49	(3)

International career^{‡}
2024–	Guyana	10	(6)
- * Club domestic league appearances and goals as of 19:04, 21 November 2026 (UTC) ‡ National team caps and goals as of 08:50, 30 September 2026 (UTC)

Isaiah Benjamin Montell Jones (born 26 June 1999) is a professional footballer who plays as a right-back and winger for EFL League One club Luton Town. Born in England, he represents the Guyana national team.

== Club career ==
=== Middlesbrough ===
Jones joined Middlesbrough in the summer of 2019 alongside Sam Folarin after helping Tooting & Mitcham to a 6th-place finish in the Isthmian League South Central Division.

After scoring three goals in three appearances in the Premier League 2 during December 2019, Jones was nominated for the Player of the Month award, losing out to future Luton Town teammate Tahith Chong of Manchester United.

On 31 January 2020, Jones joined Scottish Premiership club St Johnstone on loan until the end of the season. He made his debut for the club on 8 February 2020 in the Scottish Cup, coming on as a late substitute against Ayr United, which St. Johnstone won 1–2 at Somerset Park.

He made his first-team debut for Middlesbrough in the FA Cup in January 2021, coming on as a late substitute in a 2–1 defeat away to Brentford. Later that month, on 29 January 2021, Jones joined Scottish Championship club Queen of the South on loan until the end of the season. On his debut for the club, he scored his first senior goal in the 2–1 defeat away at Alloa Athletic.

He made his English Football League debut on the opening day of the 2021–22 season, coming on as a substitute in a 1–1 draw away to Fulham, and earned his first start for Middlesbrough a few days later in a 3–0 defeat away to Blackpool in the EFL Cup. He signed a new contract in November 2021, until the summer of 2025. After scoring his first senior goal in a 1–0 win against Swansea City, registering both assists in a 2–1 win over Blackpool and winning the game-deciding penalty against AFC Bournemouth as well as registering four clean sheets, Jones was awarded the EFL Championship Player of the Month award for December 2021 with his newly appointed manager Chris Wilder winning the Manager of the Month award. On 17 April 2024, Jones signed a new three-year deal with the club.

=== Luton Town ===
On 10 January 2025, Jones signed for Championship side Luton Town. Although the fee remained undisclosed, some local reports suggested that the deal could be worth up to £5 million with add-ons.

== International career ==
Eligible to represent England, Jamaica and Guyana, Jones began the process of obtaining a Guyanese passport in July 2023.

In August 2024, Jones was called up to the Guyana national team for the first time for matches against Suriname and Martinique. On 21 March 2025, he scored a hat-trick in the first leg of a CONCACAF Gold Cup qualifying match against Guatemala.

== Playing style ==
Originally a right winger, Jones can also play as a right-back, left-winger or wing-back on either side.

== Career statistics ==
=== Club ===
As of match played 21 November 2026

Appearances and goals by club, season and competition
Club	Season	League			National cup (Note: Includes FA Cup and Scottish Cup)		League cup (Note: Includes EFL Cup)		Other		Total	
Club	Season	Division	Apps	Goals	Apps	Goals	Apps	Goals	Apps	Goals	Apps	Goals
Tooting & Mitcham United	2017–18	Isthmian League Premier	26	1	0	0	—		1 (Note: Appearance in Alan Turvey Trophy)	0	27	1
Tooting & Mitcham United	2018–19	Isthmian League South Central	29	9	3	0	—		3 (Note: One appearance and one goal in Surrey Senior Cup, one appearance in Alan Turvey Trophy, one appearance in FA Trophy)	1	35	10
Tooting & Mitcham United	Total		55	10	3	0	0	0	4	1	62	11
Middlesbrough	2019–20	Championship	0	0	0	0	0	0	—		0	0
Middlesbrough	2020–21	Championship	0	0	1	0	0	0	—		1	0
Middlesbrough	2021–22	Championship	42	1	3	0	1	0	—		46	1
Middlesbrough	2022–23	Championship	34	3	1	0	0	0	2 (Note: Appearances in the play-offs)	0	37	3
Middlesbrough	2023–24	Championship	35	8	1	0	5	1	—		41	9
Middlesbrough	2024–25	Championship	21	0	0	0	2	0	—		23	0
Middlesbrough	Total		132	12	6	0	8	1	2	0	148	13
St Johnstone (loan)	2019–20	Scottish Premiership	0	0	1	0	0	0	—		1	0
Queen of the South (loan)	2020–21	Scottish Championship	11	1	1	0	0	0	—		12	1
Luton Town	2024–25	Championship	17	2	1	0	0	0	—		18	2
Luton Town	2025–26	League One	17	1	1	0	0	0	2 (Note: Appearance(s) in EFL Trophy)	1	20	2
Luton Town	2026–27	League One	15	0	0	0	2	0	0	0	17	0
Luton Town	Total		49	3	2	0	2	0	2	1	55	4
Career total			247	26	13	0	10	1	8	2	278	29

=== International ===
As of match played 27 September 2026

Appearances and goals by national team and year
National team	Year	Apps	Goals
Guyana	2024	6	3
Guyana	2025	2	3
Guyana	2026	2	0
Total		10	6

Scores and results list Guyana's goal tally first, score column indicates score after each Jones goal.

List of international goals scored by Isaiah Jones
No.	Date	Venue	Opponent	Score	Result	Competition	Ref.
1	9 September 2024	Stade Pierre-Aliker, Fort-de-France, Martinique	Martinique	1–0	2–2	2024–25 CONCACAF Nations League A	
2	9 September 2024	Stade Pierre-Aliker, Fort-de-France, Martinique	Martinique	2–0	2–2	2024–25 CONCACAF Nations League A	
3	19 November 2024	Synthetic Track and Field Facility, Leonora, Guyana	Barbados	5–3	5–3	2024–25 CONCACAF Nations League Play-in	
4	21 March 2025	Wildey Turf, Wildey, Barbados	Guatemala	1–1	3–2	2025 CONCACAF Gold Cup qualification	
5	21 March 2025	Wildey Turf, Wildey, Barbados	Guatemala	2–1	3–2	2025 CONCACAF Gold Cup qualification	
6	21 March 2025	Wildey Turf, Wildey, Barbados	Guatemala	3–1	3–2	2025 CONCACAF Gold Cup qualification	

== Honours ==
Luton Town

- EFL Trophy: 2025–26

Individual

- EFL Championship Player of the Month: December 2021
