= 2021–22 Middlesbrough F.C. season =

Middlesbrough
2021–22 season
- Owner: Steve Gibson
- Chairman: Steve Gibson
- Manager: Neil Warnock (until 6 November 2021); Chris Wilder (from 7 November 2021)
- Stadium: Riverside Stadium
- Championship: 7th
- FA Cup: Quarter-finals
- EFL Cup: First round
- Top goalscorer: League: Matt Crooks (10); All: Matt Crooks (11)
| Home colours | Away colours |

The 2021–22 season is Middlesbrough's 146th year in their history and fifth consecutive season in the Championship. Along with the league, the club will also compete in the FA Cup and the EFL Cup. The season covers the period from 1 July 2021 to 30 June 2022.

== Statistics ==
As of 19 September 2021
Players with names in italics and marked * were on loan from another club for the whole of their season with Middlesbrough.

| No. | Pos | Nat | Player | Total | | Championship | | FA Cup | | EFL Cup | |
| No. | Pos | Nat | Player | Apps | Goals | Apps | Goals | Apps | Goals | Apps | Goals |
|---|---|---|---|---|---|---|---|---|---|---|---|
| 1 | GK | (England) ENG | Joe Lumley | 9 | 0 | 8+0 | 0 | 0+0 | 0 | 1+0 | 0 |
| 2 | DF | (Netherlands) NED | Anfernee Dijksteel | 8 | 0 | 8+0 | 0 | 0+0 | 0 | 0+0 | 0 |
| 4 | DF | (England) ENG | Grant Hall | 7 | 0 | 7+0 | 0 | 0+0 | 0 | 0+0 | 0 |
| 6 | DF | (England) ENG | Dael Fry | 8 | 0 | 8+0 | 0 | 0+0 | 0 | 0+0 | 0 |
| 7 | MF | (England) ENG | Marcus Tavernier | 6 | 1 | 5+1 | 1 | 0+0 | 0 | 0+0 | 0 |
| 8 | MF | (Cuba) CUB | Onel Hernández* | 4 | 1 | 4+0 | 1 | 0+0 | 0 | 0+0 | 0 |
| 9 | FW | (Uganda) UGA | Uche Ikpeazu | 8 | 2 | 5+2 | 2 | 0+0 | 0 | 0+1 | 0 |
| 10 | MF | (Argentina) ARG | Martín Payero | 4 | 0 | 0+3 | 0 | 0+0 | 0 | 1+0 | 0 |
| 11 | FW | (Slovenia) SLO | Andraž Šporar* | 4 | 1 | 3+1 | 1 | 0+0 | 0 | 0+0 | 0 |
| 13 | FW | (England) ENG | Toyosi Olusanya | 1 | 0 | 0+1 | 0 | 0+0 | 0 | 0+0 | 0 |
| 14 | DF | (England) ENG | Lee Peltier | 4 | 0 | 3+0 | 0 | 0+0 | 0 | 1+0 | 0 |
| 16 | MF | (England) ENG | Jonny Howson | 7 | 1 | 6+1 | 1 | 0+0 | 0 | 0+0 | 0 |
| 17 | DF | (Northern Ireland) NIR | Paddy McNair | 6 | 0 | 6+0 | 0 | 0+0 | 0 | 0+0 | 0 |
| 18 | FW | (England) ENG | Duncan Watmore | 4 | 0 | 2+2 | 0 | 0+0 | 0 | 0+0 | 0 |
| 22 | DF | (Ivory Coast) CIV | Sol Bamba | 3 | 0 | 1+1 | 0 | 0+0 | 0 | 1+0 | 0 |
| 23 | MF | (Cameroon) CMR | James Léa Siliki* | 3 | 0 | 2+1 | 0 | 0+0 | 0 | 0+0 | 0 |
| 24 | MF | (England) ENG | Connor Malley | 1 | 0 | 0+0 | 0 | 0+0 | 0 | 1+0 | 0 |
| 25 | MF | (England) ENG | Matt Crooks | 8 | 2 | 8+0 | 2 | 0+0 | 0 | 0+0 | 0 |
| 27 | DF | (England) ENG | Marc Bola | 5 | 1 | 4+1 | 1 | 0+0 | 0 | 0+0 | 0 |
| 34 | MF | (England) ENG | Jeremy Sivi | 1 | 0 | 0+0 | 0 | 0+0 | 0 | 0+1 | 0 |
| 35 | MF | (England) ENG | Isaiah Jones | 9 | 0 | 5+3 | 0 | 0+0 | 0 | 1+0 | 0 |
| 37 | FW | (England) ENG | Josh Coburn | 2 | 0 | 0+1 | 0 | 0+0 | 0 | 1+0 | 0 |
Players out on loan:
| 15 | DF | (England) ENG | Nathan Wood | 1 | 0 | 0+0 | 0 | 0+0 | 0 | 1+0 | 0 |
| 19 | FW | (England) ENG | Chuba Akpom | 1 | 0 | 0+1 | 0 | 0+0 | 0 | 0+0 | 0 |
| 29 | DF | (England) ENG | Djed Spence | 4 | 0 | 2+1 | 0 | 0+0 | 0 | 1+0 | 0 |
| 33 | DF | (England) ENG | Jack Robinson | 1 | 0 | 0+0 | 0 | 0+0 | 0 | 1+0 | 0 |
| 38 | MF | (England) ENG | Hayden Hackney | 1 | 0 | 0+0 | 0 | 0+0 | 0 | 0+1 | 0 |
Players who have left the club:
| 5 | MF | (Egypt) EGY | Sam Morsy | 4 | 0 | 3+0 | 0 | 0+0 | 0 | 1+0 | 0 |

=== Goals record ===
As of 19 September 2021

| Rank | No. | Nat. | Po. | Name | Championship | FA Cup | League Cup | Total |
|---|---|---|---|---|---|---|---|---|
| 1 | 9 | (Uganda) | CF | Uche Ikpeazu | 2 | 0 | 0 | 2 |
| 1 | 25 | (England) | CM | Matt Crooks | 2 | 0 | 0 | 2 |
| 3 | 7 | (England) | RW | Marcus Tavernier | 1 | 0 | 0 | 1 |
| 3 | 8 | (Cuba) | RW | Onel Hernández | 1 | 0 | 0 | 1 |
| 3 | 11 | (Slovenia) | CF | Andraž Šporar | 1 | 0 | 0 | 1 |
| 3 | 16 | (England) | CM | Jonny Howson | 1 | 0 | 0 | 1 |
| 3 | 27 | (England) | RB | Marc Bola | 1 | 0 | 0 | 1 |
| Total | | | | | 9 | 0 | 0 | 9 |

=== Disciplinary record ===
As of 19 September 2021

| Rank | No. | Nat. | Po. | Name | Championship | | | FA Cup | | | League Cup | | | Total | | |
| Rank | No. | Nat. | Po. | Name | Booked | (yellow card) (yellow-red card) | Sent off (straight red) | Booked | (yellow card) (yellow-red card) | Sent off (straight red) | Booked | (yellow card) (yellow-red card) | Sent off (straight red) | Booked | (yellow card) (yellow-red card) | Sent off (straight red) |
|---|---|---|---|---|---|---|---|---|---|---|---|---|---|---|---|---|
| 1 | 25 | (England) | CM | Matt Crooks | 3 | 0 | 0 | 0 | 0 | 0 | 0 | 0 | 0 | 3 | 0 | 0 |
| 2 | ~~5~~ | (Egypt) | DM | Sam Morsy | 0 | 0 | 1 | 0 | 0 | 0 | 1 | 0 | 0 | 1 | 0 | 1 |
| 2 | 10 | (Argentina) | CM | Martín Payero | 1 | 0 | 0 | 0 | 0 | 0 | 1 | 0 | 0 | 2 | 0 | 0 |
| 2 | 14 | (England) | RB | Lee Peltier | 2 | 0 | 0 | 0 | 0 | 0 | 0 | 0 | 0 | 2 | 0 | 0 |
| 2 | 16 | (England) | CM | Jonny Howson | 2 | 0 | 0 | 0 | 0 | 0 | 0 | 0 | 0 | 2 | 0 | 0 |
| 2 | 27 | (England) | RB | Marc Bola | 2 | 0 | 0 | 0 | 0 | 0 | 0 | 0 | 0 | 2 | 0 | 0 |
| 2 | 35 | (England) | RW | Isaiah Jones | 2 | 0 | 0 | 0 | 0 | 0 | 0 | 0 | 0 | 2 | 0 | 0 |
| 8 | 4 | (England) | CB | Grant Hall | 1 | 0 | 0 | 0 | 0 | 0 | 0 | 0 | 0 | 1 | 0 | 0 |
| 8 | 6 | (England) | CB | Dael Fry | 1 | 0 | 0 | 0 | 0 | 0 | 0 | 0 | 0 | 1 | 0 | 0 |
| 8 | 7 | (England) | RW | Marcus Tavernier | 1 | 0 | 0 | 0 | 0 | 0 | 0 | 0 | 0 | 1 | 0 | 0 |
| 8 | 8 | (Cuba) | RW | Onel Hernández | 1 | 0 | 0 | 0 | 0 | 0 | 0 | 0 | 0 | 1 | 0 | 0 |
| 8 | 9 | (Uganda) | CF | Uche Ikpeazu | 1 | 0 | 0 | 0 | 0 | 0 | 0 | 0 | 0 | 1 | 0 | 0 |
| 8 | 11 | (Slovenia) | CF | Andraž Šporar | 1 | 0 | 0 | 0 | 0 | 0 | 0 | 0 | 0 | 1 | 0 | 0 |
| 8 | 13 | (England) | RW | Toyosi Olusanya | 1 | 0 | 0 | 0 | 0 | 0 | 0 | 0 | 0 | 1 | 0 | 0 |
| 8 | 17 | (Northern Ireland) | CB | Paddy McNair | 1 | 0 | 0 | 0 | 0 | 0 | 0 | 0 | 0 | 1 | 0 | 0 |
| 8 | 22 | (Ivory Coast) | CB | Sol Bamba | 1 | 0 | 0 | 0 | 0 | 0 | 0 | 0 | 0 | 1 | 0 | 0 |
| Total | | | | | 21 | 0 | 1 | 0 | 0 | 0 | 2 | 0 | 0 | 23 | 0 | 1 |

== Background and pre-season ==
Middlesbrough finished the 2020–21 season in 10th position in the EFL Championship.

=== Pre-season ===
Middlesbrough announced they will play friendly matches against Bishop Auckland, Saltash United, Tavistock, Plymouth Argyle, York City and Rotherham United as part of their pre-season preparations.

| 14 July 2021 Friendly | Bishop Auckland | 0–3 | Middlesbrough | Bishop Auckland |
| 19:00 BST | | Report | Ikpeazu 12'; Spence 73'; Sivi 89' | Stadium: Heritage Park |

| 19 July 2021 Friendly | Saltash United | 1–2 | Middlesbrough | Saltash |
| 19:00 BST | Barker (?) | Report | McNair (?); Wing (?) | Stadium: Kimberly Stadium |

| 21 July 2021 Friendly | Tavistock | 0–7 | Middlesbrough | Tavistock |
| 19:00 BST | | Report | Watmore 12', 34'; Coulson 29', 39'; Ikpeazu 31'; Wing 72'; Akpom 86' | Stadium: Langsford Park |

| 23 July 2021 Friendly | Plymouth Argyle | 1–2 | Middlesbrough | Plymouth |
| 19:00 BST | Gillesphey 55' | Report | Crooks 15'; Tavernier 70' | Stadium: Home Park |

| 27 July 2021 Friendly | York City | 2–1 | Middlesbrough | Huntington |
| 19:00 BST | Heaney 25'; Beck 39' | Report | Fry 6' | Stadium: York Community Stadium |

| 30 July 2021 Friendly | Rotherham United | 0–1 | Middlesbrough | Rotherham |
| 19:00 BST | | Report | McNair 14' | Stadium: AESSEAL New York Stadium |

== Competitions ==
=== Championship ===
==== League table ====
| Pos | Team | Pld | W | D | L | GF | GA | GD | Pts | Promotion, qualification or relegation |
|---|---|---|---|---|---|---|---|---|---|---|
| 4 | Nottingham Forest (O, P) | 46 | 23 | 11 | 12 | 73 | 40 | +33 | 80 | Qualification for Championship play-offs |
| 5 | Sheffield United | 46 | 21 | 12 | 13 | 63 | 45 | +18 | 75 | Qualification for Championship play-offs |
| 6 | Luton Town | 46 | 21 | 12 | 13 | 63 | 55 | +8 | 75 | Qualification for Championship play-offs |
| 7 | Middlesbrough | 46 | 20 | 10 | 16 | 59 | 50 | +9 | 70 | |
| 8 | Blackburn Rovers | 46 | 19 | 12 | 15 | 59 | 50 | +9 | 69 | |
| 9 | Millwall | 46 | 18 | 15 | 13 | 53 | 45 | +8 | 69 | |
| 10 | West Bromwich Albion | 46 | 18 | 13 | 15 | 52 | 45 | +7 | 67 | |

Source: EFL Official Website
Rules for classification: 1) Points; 2) Goal difference; 3) Number of goals scored; 4) Head-to-head results; 5) Wins; 6) Away goals; 7) Penalty points (sec 9.5); 8) 12-point sending off offences
(O) Play-off winners; (P) Promoted

==== Results summary ====
| Overall | | | | | | | | Home | | | | | | Away | | | | | |
| Pld | W | D | L | GF | GA | GD | Pts | W | D | L | GF | GA | GD | W | D | L | GF | GA | GD |
|---|---|---|---|---|---|---|---|---|---|---|---|---|---|---|---|---|---|---|---|
| 46 | 20 | 10 | 16 | 59 | 50 | +9 | 70 | 14 | 2 | 7 | 34 | 21 | +13 | 6 | 8 | 9 | 25 | 29 | −4 |

Last updated: 7 May 2022.

==== Results by matchday ====
| Matchday | 1 | 2 | 3 | 4 | 5 | 6 | 7 | 8 | 9 | 10 | 11 | 12 | 13 | 14 | 15 | 16 | 17 | 18 | 19 | 20 | 21 | 22 | 23 | 24 | 25 | 26 | 27 | 28 | 29 | 30 | 31 | 32 | 33 | 34 | 35 | 36 | 37 | 38 | 39 | 40 | 41 | 42 | 43 | 44 | 45 | 46 |
|---|---|---|---|---|---|---|---|---|---|---|---|---|---|---|---|---|---|---|---|---|---|---|---|---|---|---|---|---|---|---|---|---|---|---|---|---|---|---|---|---|---|---|---|---|---|---|
| Home or away | A | H | H | A | H | A | A | H | A | H | A | H | H | A | H | A | A | H | H | A | H | A | H | H | A | H | A | H | A | H | A | H | A | H | A | A | A | A | H | H | A | H | A | H | H | A |
| Result | D | W | L | D | D | L | W | L | L | W | L | W | W | W | L | L | D | D | L | W | W | D | W | W | W | W | L | W | D | W | L | W | L | W | L | D | W | W | L | L | D | L | D | W | W | L |
| Position | 12 | 7 | 10 | 12 | 13 | 15 | 11 | 16 | 18 | 12 | 15 | 12 | 10 | 6 | 11 | 14 | 14 | 14 | 15 | 12 | 9 | 9 | 9 | 5 | 5 | 6 | 7 | 6 | 7 | 6 | 7 | 7 | 8 | 6 | 8 | 8 | 7 | 5 | 7 | 8 | 7 | 9 | 8 | 7 | 7 | 7 |

Updated to match(es) played on 7 May 2022. Source: Statto.com
A = Away; H = Home; W = Win; D = Draw; L = Loss

==== Matches ====
Middlesbrough's fixtures were revealed on 24 June 2021.

| 8 August 2021 1 | Fulham | 1–1 | Middlesbrough | Fulham |
| 13:30 BST | Mitrović (yellow card) 1'; Wilson 29', (yellow card) 71' | Report | McNair (yellow card) 16'; Ikpeazu (yellow card) 36'; Bola (yellow card) 53', (goal) 77' | Stadium: Craven Cottage; Attendance: 16,058; Referee: Keith Stroud |
Note: Live on Sky Sports

| 14 August 2021 2 | Middlesbrough | 2–1 | Bristol City | Middlesbrough |
| 15:00 BST | Ikpeazu 38'; Crooks 70' | Report | Atkinson (yellow card) 23'; King 60' | Stadium: Riverside Stadium; Attendance: 22,004; Referee: Oliver Langford |

| 18 August 2021 3 | Middlesbrough | 2–3 | Queens Park Rangers | Middlesbrough |
| 19:45 BST | Ikpeazu 7' (pen.); Jones (yellow card) 54'; Crooks 72'; Payero (yellow card) 90+8' | Report | Odubajo (yellow card) 38' (yellow-red card) 50'; Howson 48' (o.g.); Dykes 56'; Willock 76'; Johansen (yellow card) 90+3' | Stadium: Riverside Stadium; Referee: Steve Martin |

| 21 August 2021 4 | Derby County | 0–0 | Middlesbrough | Derby |
| 15:00 BST | Jagielka (yellow card) 65'; Byrne (yellow card) 90+2' | Report | Peltier (yellow card) 30'; Tavernier (yellow card) 43'; Bola (yellow card) 54'; Jones (yellow card) 85' | Stadium: Pride Park Stadium; Attendance: 16,123; Referee: Andy Davies |

| 28 August 2021 5 | Middlesbrough | 1–1 | Blackburn Rovers | Middlesbrough |
| 15:00 BST | Howson 36'; Morsy (red card) 81'; Olusanya (yellow card) 87' | Report | Gallagher 17'; Carter (yellow card) 19' (yellow-red card) 79'; Travis (yellow card) 87'; Dolan (yellow card) 90+4' | Stadium: Riverside Stadium; Referee: Michael Salisbury |

| 11 September 2021 6 | Coventry City | 2–0 | Middlesbrough | Coventry |
| 15:00 BST | Hamer (yellow card) 26'; Gyökeres 71'; Waghorn 90+1' | Report | Howson (yellow card) 32'; Bamba (yellow card) 63'; Hall (yellow card) 75' | Stadium: Coventry Building Society Arena; Attendance: 18,515; Referee: Leigh Doughty |

| 15 September 2021 7 | Nottingham Forest | 0–2 | Middlesbrough | West Bridgford |
| 19:45 BST | Yates (yellow card) 68' | Report | Šporar 24', (yellow card) 26'; Howson (yellow card) 45+1'; Peltier (yellow card) 50'; Crooks (yellow card) 62'; Hernández 72', (yellow card) 73' | Stadium: City Ground; Attendance: 23,830; Referee: James Linington |

| 18 September 2021 8 | Middlesbrough | 1–2 | Blackpool | Middlesbrough |
| 15:00 BST | Tavernier 8'; Fry (yellow card) 12'; Crooks (yellow card) 35' | Report | Ekpiteta 62'; Hall 78' (o.g.); Gabriel (yellow card) 90+4' | Stadium: Riverside Stadium; Referee: David Webb |

| 25 September 2021 9 | Reading | 1–0 | Middlesbrough | Reading |
| 15:00 BST | Tetek (yellow card) 50'; Halilović 55'; Southwood (yellow card) 79'; Rahman (yellow card) 81' | Report | Jones (yellow card) 43'; Peltier (yellow card) 61'; Crooks (red card) 87'; McNair (yellow card) 90+2' | Stadium: Select Car Leasing Stadium; Referee: Peter Bankes |

| 28 September 2021 10 | Middlesbrough | 2–0 | Sheffield United | Middlesbrough |
| 19:45 BST | Watmore 9'; Peltier (yellow card) 13'; McNair 37'; Crooks (yellow card) 65'; Šporar (yellow card) 70'; Bamba (yellow card) 73' | Report | Stevens (yellow card) 10'; Fleck (yellow card) 66' | Stadium: Riverside Stadium; Referee: James Linington |

| 2 October 2021 11 | Hull City | 2–0 | Middlesbrough | Kingston upon Hull |
| 15:00 BST | Lumley 81' (o.g.); Wilks (yellow card) 90+2', (goal) 90+3' | Report | Tavernier (yellow card) 7'; Peltier (yellow card) 58'; McNair (yellow card) 78' | Stadium: MKM Stadium; Attendance: 13,696; Referee: Andy Davies |

| 16 October 2021 12 | Middlesbrough | 2–0 | Peterborough United | Middlesbrough |
| 15:00 BST | Payero (yellow card) 45'; Ikpeazu (yellow card) 67'; McNair 85' (pen.); Coburn 90+4' | Report | Taylor (yellow card) 22'; Edwards (yellow card) 35'; Szmodics (yellow card) 49'; Cornell (yellow card) 84' | Stadium: Riverside Stadium; Attendance: 19,556; Referee: John Busby |

| 20 October 2021 13 | Middlesbrough | 2–0 | Barnsley | Middlesbrough |
| 19:45 BST | Šporar 20'; Peltier (yellow card) 73'; Crooks 87' | Report | Moon (yellow card) 86' | Stadium: Riverside Stadium; Attendance: 17,931; Referee: Andrew Madley |

| 23 October 2021 14 | Cardiff City | 0–2 | Middlesbrough | Leckwith |
| 12:30 BST | Pack (yellow card) 28'; McGuinness (yellow card) 34'; Flint (yellow card) 70' | Report | Šporar 35' (pen.); Ikpeazu (yellow card) 38'; Payero 74' | Stadium: Cardiff City Stadium; Attendance: 17,513; Referee: Jeremy Simpson |

| 30 October 2021 15 | Middlesbrough | 0–2 | Birmingham City | Middlesbrough |
| 15:00 BST | | Report | Sanderson (yellow card) 19'; Gardner (yellow card) 45+2'; Roberts 53'; Hogan 56'; McGree (yellow card) 90+4' | Stadium: Riverside Stadium; Referee: Josh Smith |

| 2 November 2021 16 | Luton Town | 3–1 | Middlesbrough | Luton |
| 19:45 GMT | Potts (yellow card) 30'; Bree (yellow card) 31'; Bradley 57'; Adebayo 60'; Cornick 62'; Onyedinma (yellow card) 70'; Lansbury (yellow card) 79' | Report | Coburn 15', (yellow card) 59'; Crooks (yellow card) 39'; Watmore (yellow card) 74' | Stadium: Kenilworth Road; Attendance: 9,790; Referee: Tim Robinson |

| 6 November 2021 17 | West Bromwich Albion | 1–1 | Middlesbrough | West Bromwich |
| 15:00 GMT | Kipré (yellow card) 46'; Diangana (yellow card) 49', (goal) 65'; Snodgrass (yellow card) 90+2' | Report | McNair (yellow card) 24'; Peltier (yellow card) 30'; Coburn 38'; Jones (yellow card) 65'; Howson (yellow card) 89' | Stadium: The Hawthorns; Referee: Matt Donohue |

| 20 November 2021 18 | Middlesbrough | 1–1 | Millwall | Middlesbrough |
| 15:00 GMT | Crooks 15'; Howson (yellow card) 58' | Report | Bamba 27' (o.g.); Bennett (yellow card) 34'; Cooper (yellow card) 45+3' | Stadium: Riverside Stadium; Attendance: 20,845; Referee: Oliver Langford |

| 23 November 2021 19 | Middlesbrough | 1–2 | Preston North End | Middlesbrough |
| 19:45 GMT | McNair 33' | Report | Browne (yellow card) 63'; Evans (yellow card) 75', (goal) 77'; Riis Jakobsen 81'; Earl (yellow card) 85'; Johnson (yellow card) 90+2' | Stadium: Riverside Stadium; Attendance: 18,013; Referee: Andy Woolmer |

| 27 November 2021 20 | Huddersfield Town | 1–2 | Middlesbrough | Huddersfield |
| 15:00 GMT | Daniels 90+3' (o.g.) | Report | Watmore 16', 23'; Bola (yellow card) 80'; Crooks (yellow card) 85'; McNair (yellow card) 88' | Stadium: John Smith's Stadium; Attendance: 19,192; Referee: Keith Stroud |

| 4 December 2021 21 | Middlesbrough | 1–0 | Swansea City | Middlesbrough |
| 15:00 GMT | Jones 26'; McNair (yellow card) 70' | Report | Paterson (yellow card) 45' | Stadium: Riverside Stadium; Attendance: 18,707; Referee: Andy Davies |

| 11 December 2021 22 | Stoke City | 0–0 | Middlesbrough | Stoke-on-Trent |
| 15:00 GMT | Batth (yellow card) 35'; Smith (yellow card) 72' | Report | Dijksteel (yellow card) 10' | Stadium: Bet365 Stadium; Attendance: 21,140; Referee: Michael Salisbury |

| 18 December 2021 23 | Middlesbrough | 1–0 | Bournemouth | Middlesbrough |
| 12:30 GMT | Šporar 53' (pen.); McNair (yellow card) 66'; Taylor (yellow card) 77'; Jones (yellow card) 82'; Hernández (yellow card) 86' | Report | Cahill (yellow card) 43'; Billing (yellow card) 57' | Stadium: Riverside Stadium; Referee: Chris Kavanagh |

| 26 December 2021 24 | Middlesbrough | 2–0 | Nottingham Forest | Middlesbrough |
| 15:00 GMT | Yates 17' (o.g.); Howson (yellow card) 26'; Šporar 69' | Report | Samba (yellow card) 32'; Carvalho (yellow card) 71'; Yates (yellow card) 90+3' | Stadium: Riverside Stadium; Attendance: 29,832; Referee: David Webb |

| 29 December 2021 25 | Blackpool | 1–2 | Middlesbrough | Blackpool |
| 19:45 GMT | Connolly (yellow card) 32'; Husband (yellow card) 44'; Lavery 90+1' | Report | Fry (yellow card) 40'; Šporar 60', (yellow card) 61'; Crooks (yellow card) 71'; Peltier (yellow card) 89'; Watmore 90+3' | Stadium: Bloomfield Road; Attendance: 13,428; Referee: Steve Martin |

| 15 January 2022 26 | Middlesbrough | 2–1 | Reading | Middlesbrough |
| 15:00 GMT | Tavernier (yellow card) 74'; Crooks 84', 90+5' | Report | Bristow (yellow card) 12'; Hoilett (yellow card) 36'; Drinkwater (yellow card) 65'; Carroll 68' | Stadium: Riverside Stadium; Attendance: 21,634; Referee: James Linington |

| 24 January 2022 27 | Blackburn Rovers | 1–0 | Middlesbrough | Blackburn |
| 19:45 GMT | Nyambe (yellow card) 37'; Travis (yellow card) 50'; Gallagher 67'; Wharton (yellow card) 81'; Edun (yellow card) 90+11' | Report | Taylor (yellow card) 4'; Crooks (yellow card) 15'; Connolly (yellow card) 26'; Tavernier (yellow card) 29'; McNair (yellow card) 90+3'; Jones (yellow card) 90+9' | Stadium: Ewood Park; Attendance: 14,670; Referee: Darren England |

| 29 January 2022 28 | Middlesbrough | 1–0 | Coventry City | Middlesbrough |
| 15:00 GMT | Šporar 58'; Taylor (yellow card) 90+1'; Lumley (yellow card) 90+3' | Report | Shipley (yellow card) 64' | Stadium: Riverside Stadium; Attendance: 22,940; Referee: Matt Donohue |

| 9 February 2022 29 | Queens Park Rangers | 2–2 | Middlesbrough | Shepherd's Bush, London |
| 19:45 GMT | Chair 29'; Willock 46' | Report | Fry 45+2'; Adomah 60' (o.g.); Howson (yellow card) 84' | Stadium: Kiyan Prince Foundation Stadium; Attendance: 14,140; Referee: Dean Whitestone |

| 12 February 2022 30 | Middlesbrough | 4–1 | Derby County | Middlesbrough |
| 15:00 GMT | Buchanan 15' (o.g.); Tavernier (yellow card) 27'; Crooks (yellow card) 31', (goal) 45+2'; Connolly 44'; Howson (yellow card) 50'; Watmore 89' | Report | Lawrence (yellow card) 27'; Bird 39'; Ebiowei (yellow card) 87' | Stadium: Riverside Stadium; Attendance: 26,266; Referee: Mike Dean |

| 19 February 2022 31 | Bristol City | 2–1 | Middlesbrough | Ashton Gate |
| 15:00 GMT | Weimann 7'; Williams (yellow card) 9'; Scott (yellow card) 40'; Semenyo 68' | Report | Crooks (yellow card) 17', (goal) 90' | Stadium: Ashton Gate Stadium; Attendance: 20,148; Referee: Leigh Doughty |

| 22 February 2022 32 | Middlesbrough | 2–1 | West Bromwich Albion | Middlesbrough |
| 19:45 GMT | McNair 60'; Tavernier 69'; Jones (yellow card) 86'; Howson (yellow card) 90+2' | Report | Molumby 28', (yellow card) 31'; Reach (yellow card) 37'; Furlong (yellow card) 86' | Stadium: Riverside Stadium; Attendance: 21,646; Referee: Michael Salisbury |

| 26 February 2022 33 | Barnsley | 3–2 | Middlesbrough | Barnsley |
| 15:00 GMT | Andersen 7'; Bassi 16', 54'; Vita (yellow card) 62'; Kitching (yellow card) 72'; Collins (yellow card) 79' | Report | Šporar 61' (pen.); Kitching 90+5' (o.g.) | Stadium: Oakwell Stadium; Attendance: 16,107; Referee: James Linington |

| 5 March 2022 34 | Middlesbrough | 2–1 | Luton Town | Middlesbrough |
| 15:00 GMT | McNair 17' (pen.); Watmore 87'; Lumley (yellow card) 90+1'; Coburn (yellow card) 90+3' | Report | Jerome (yellow card) 20'; Hylton (yellow card) 49'; Lansbury (yellow card) 61'; Cornick 90+6' | Stadium: Riverside Stadium; Attendance: 23,817; Referee: Jeremy Simpson |

| 8 March 2022 35 | Sheffield United | 4–1 | Middlesbrough | Sheffield |
| 19:45 GMT | Berge 23'; Sharp 25', (yellow card) 49'; Gibbs-White (yellow card) 49', (goal) 79'; Hourihane (yellow card) 57'; Robinson 59' | Report | Howson (yellow card) 41'; Peltier (yellow card) 49'; Balogun 62'; Crooks (yellow card) 84' | Stadium: Bramall Lane; Attendance: 28,994; Referee: Tim Robinson |

| 12 March 2022 36 | Millwall | 0–0 | Middlesbrough | Bermondsey |
| 15:00 GMT | Cooper (yellow card) 4'; Ballard (yellow card) 16'; Malone (yellow card) 19'; Wallace (yellow card) 34' | Report | Jones (yellow card) 19' | Stadium: The Den; Attendance: 16,734; Referee: Robert Jones |

| 15 March 2022 37 | Birmingham City | 0–2 | Middlesbrough | Birmingham |
| 19:45 GMT | Pedersen (yellow card) 40' (yellow-red card) 86'; Hernández (yellow card) 80' | Report | Connolly 23'; Balogun 62'; Lumley (yellow card) 80'; Crooks (yellow card) 90' | Stadium: St Andrew's; Attendance: 15,852; Referee: Darren Bond |

| 2 April 2022 38 | Peterborough United | 0–4 | Middlesbrough | Peterborough |
| 15:00 BST | Kent (yellow card) 28'; Knight (yellow card) 35'; Grant (yellow card) 90' | Report | Tavernier 26', (yellow card) 74'; Balogun 49'; Coburn 82'; Watmore 90' | Stadium: Weston Homes Stadium; Attendance: 11,755; Referee: Leigh Doughty |

| 6 April 2022 39 | Middlesbrough | 0–1 | Fulham | Middlesbrough |
| 19:45 BST | Crooks (yellow card) 72'; McGree (yellow card) 83'; McNair (yellow card) 90+3' | Report | Carvalho (yellow card) 53'; Reed (yellow card) 65'; Mitrović 73' | Stadium: Riverside Stadium; Attendance: 21,995; Referee: James Linington |

| 9 April 2022 40 | Middlesbrough | 0–1 | Hull City | Middlesbrough |
| 15:00 BST | Crooks (yellow card) 16'; Tavernier (yellow card) 70'; Connolly (yellow card) 81' | Report | McLoughlin (yellow card) 26'; Slater (yellow card) 42'; Lewis-Potter 74'; Smallwood (yellow card) 81'; Honeyman (yellow card) 85'; Docherty (yellow card) 89' | Stadium: Riverside Stadium; Attendance: 24,603; Referee: Andy Woolmer |

| 15 April 2022 41 | Bournemouth | 0–0 | Middlesbrough | Kings Park |
| 15:00 BST | Billing (yellow card) 61' | Report | Crooks (yellow card) 88'; Jones (yellow card) 90+1' | Stadium: Vitality Stadium; Referee: Tim Robinson |

| 18 April 2022 42 | Middlesbrough | 0–2 | Huddersfield Town | Middlesbrough |
| 12:30 BST | Bamba (yellow card) 44'; McGree (yellow card) 68'; Bola (yellow card) 70' | Report | Toffolo (yellow card) 36'; Sarr 41'; Rhodes 60'; O'Brien (yellow card) 76'; Russell (yellow card) 79' | Stadium: Riverside Stadium; Attendance: 24,230; Referee: Darren England |

| 23 April 2022 43 | Swansea City | 1–1 | Middlesbrough | Landore |
| 15:00 BST | Obafemi 48'; Wolf (yellow card) 84'; Christie (yellow card) 87' | Report | McGree 46'; Bamba (yellow card) 82' | Stadium: Swansea.com Stadium; Attendance: 18,246; Referee: David Webb |

| 27 April 2022 44 | Middlesbrough | 2–0 | Cardiff City | Middlesbrough |
| 19:45 BST | Tavernier 28'; McGree 53'; Jones (yellow card) 88'; Howson (yellow card) 90' | Report | Nelson (yellow card) 27'; Wintle (yellow card) 33'; Denham (yellow card) 62'; Vaulks (yellow card) 90' | Stadium: Riverside Stadium; Attendance: 19,727; Referee: Matt Donohue |

| 30 April 2022 45 | Middlesbrough | 3–1 | Stoke City | Middlesbrough |
| 15:00 BST | Crooks 21', 72'; Baker 25' (o.g.) | Report | Powell 90+4' | Stadium: Riverside Stadium; Attendance: 24,942; Referee: Jeremy Simpson |

| 7 May 2022 46 | Preston North End | 4–1 | Middlesbrough | Preston |
| 12:30 BST | Browne 24'; Fry 35' (o.g.), (yellow card) 66'; Johnson (yellow card) 45' van den Berg (yellow card) 45'; Riis Jakobsen 53', 74' (pen.); McCann (yellow card) 56' | Report | McNair (yellow card) 45' (yellow-red card) 73'; Daniels (yellow card) 45'; Tavernier 48'; Dijksteel (yellow card) 58'; Jones (yellow card) 72'; Crooks (yellow card) 84' | Stadium: Deepdale; Attendance: 17,691; Referee: Tim Robinson |

=== FA Cup ===
Middlesbrough were drawn away to Mansfield Town in the third round. In the quarter-final, Boro were handed a home tie against Premier League side Chelsea.

| 8 January 2022 Third round | Mansfield Town | 2–3 | Middlesbrough | Mansfield |
| 12:15 GMT | Hewitt (yellow card) 38'; O'Toole (yellow card) 64'; Hawkins 67', (yellow card) 71'; Oates 85' | Report | Ikpeazu 4', (yellow card) 37'; Boyd-Munce 14'; Bamba (yellow card) 33'; O'Toole 90+5' (o.g.) | Stadium: One Call Stadium; Referee: Keith Stroud |

| 4 February 2022 Fourth round | Manchester United | 1–1 (a.e.t.) (7–8 p) | Middlesbrough | Manchester |
| 20:00 GMT | Ronaldo (penalty missed) 20'; Sancho 25'; Pogba (yellow card) 42'; Fred (yellow card) 114' | Report | Crooks 64'; Tavernier (yellow card) 71' | Stadium: Old Trafford; Attendance: 71,871; Referee: Anthony Taylor |
| | Penalties |
| | Mata (penalty scored); Maguire (penalty scored); Fred (penalty scored); Ronaldo (penalty scored); Fernandes (penalty scored); McTominay (penalty scored); Dalot (penalty scored); Elanga (penalty missed) | | (penalty scored) McNair; (penalty scored) Payero; (penalty scored) Howson; (penalty scored) Tavernier; (penalty scored) Bamba; (penalty scored) Watmore; (penalty scored) Fry; (penalty scored) Peltier |

| 1 March 2022 Fifth round | Middlesbrough | 1–0 (a.e.t.) | Tottenham Hotspur | Middlesbrough |
| 19:55 GMT | McNair (yellow card) 57'; Coburn 107' | Report | Romero (yellow card) 58' | Stadium: Riverside Stadium; Attendance: 31,135; Referee: Darren England |

| 19 March 2022 Quarter-finals | Middlesbrough | 0–2 | Chelsea | Middlesbrough |
| 17:15 GMT | Howson (yellow card) 87'; Peltier (yellow card) 89' | Report | Lukaku 15'; Ziyech 31' | Stadium: Riverside Stadium; Attendance: 31,422; Referee: Paul Tierney |

=== EFL Cup ===
Middlesbrough were drawn away to Blackpool in the first round.

| 11 August 2021 First round | Blackpool | 3–0 | Middlesbrough | Blackpool |
| 19:45 BST | Ekpiteta (yellow card) 19'; Connolly 31'; Casey (yellow card) 33'; Lavery 77'; Anderson 78' | Report | Morsy (yellow card) 31'; Payero (yellow card) 36' | Stadium: Bloomfield Road; Attendance: 5,836; Referee: Bobby Madley |

== Transfers ==
=== Transfers in ===
| Date | Position | Nationality | Name | From | Fee | Source |
|---|---|---|---|---|---|---|
| 11 May 2021 | DF | ENG | Josh Wells | Lowestoft Town | Undisclosed | |
| 25 May 2021 | DF | ENG | Jeremy Sivi | Onside Football Academy | Free | |
| 1 July 2021 | FW | ENG | Sammy Ameobi | Nottingham Forest | Free | |
| 1 July 2021 | GK | ENG | Joe Lumley | Queens Park Rangers | Free | |
| 2 July 2021 | FW | UGA | Uche Ikpeazu | Wycombe Wanderers | Undisclosed | |
| 2 July 2021 | DF | ENG | Lee Peltier | West Bromwich Albion | Free | |
| 23 July 2021 | MF | ENG | Matt Crooks | Rotherham United | Undisclosed | |
| 5 August 2021 | MF | ARG | Martín Payero | Banfield | Undisclosed | |
| 9 August 2021 | GK | ENG | Luke Daniels | Brentford | Free | |
| 10 August 2021 | DF | CIV | Sol Bamba | Cardiff City | Free | |
| 20 August 2021 | FW | ENG | Toyosi Olusanya | Billericay Town | Free | |
| 18 November 2021 | DF | WAL | Neil Taylor | Aston Villa | Free | |
| 7 January 2022 | MF | NIR | Caolan Boyd-Munce | Birmingham City | Undisclosed | |
| 14 January 2022 | MF | AUS | Riley McGree | Charlotte | Undisclosed | |

=== Loans in ===
| Date from | Position | Nationality | Name | From | Date until | Source |
|---|---|---|---|---|---|---|
| 29 August 2021 | RW | CUB | Onel Hernández | Norwich City | 14 January 2022 (Note: On 14 January, Hernández was recalled by his parent club Norwich.) | |
| 31 August 2021 | CM | CMR | James Léa Siliki | Stade Rennais | End of season | |
| 31 August 2021 | CF | SVN | Andraž Šporar | Sporting CP | End of season | |
| 2 January 2022 | CF | IRL | Aaron Connolly | Brighton & Hove Albion | End of season | |
| 12 January 2022 | CF | ENG | Folarin Balogun | Arsenal | End of season | |

=== Loans out ===
| Date from | Position | Nationality | Name | To | Date until | Source |
|---|---|---|---|---|---|---|
| 1 July 2021 | GK | ENG | Zach Hemming | Kilmarnock | End of season | |
| 27 July 2021 | CM | ENG | Lewis Wing | Sheffield Wednesday | End of season | |
| 30 July 2021 | CF | ENG | Rumarn Burrell | Kilmarnock | End of season | |
| 9 August 2021 | LB | ENG | Hayden Coulson | Ipswich Town | 31 January 2022 (Note: On 31 January, Coulson was recalled to facilitate a loan move to Peterborough.) | |
| 18 August 2021 | GK | ENG | Sol Brynn | Queen of the South | 2 January 2022 | (Note: On 30 December, it was announced Brynn will return from his loan spell at Queen of the South.) |
| 26 August 2021 | CF | ENG | Chuba Akpom | PAOK | End of season | |
| 28 August 2021 | LB | ENG | Jack Robinson | Yeovil Town | End of season | |
| 31 August 2021 | CM | ENG | Hayden Hackney | Scunthorpe United | End of season | (Note: On 4 January 2022, Hayden's loan at Scunthorpe was extended until the end of the season.) |
| 31 August 2021 | SS | ENG | Stephen Walker | Tranmere Rovers | End of season | |
| 31 August 2021 | CB | ENG | Nathan Wood | Hibernian | End of season | |
| 1 September 2021 | RB | ENG | Djed Spence | Nottingham Forest | End of season | |
| 31 December 2021 | GK | AUT | Dejan Stojanović | FC Ingolstadt | End of season | |
| 26 January 2022 | CM | ENG | Isaac Fletcher | Hartlepool United | End of season | |
| 26 January 2022 | RW | ENG | Sam Folarin | Queen of the South | End of season | |
| 28 January 2022 | CF | IRL | Calum Kavanagh | Harrogate Town | End of season | |
| 31 January 2022 | LB | ENG | Hayden Coulson | Peterborough United | End of season | |
| 31 January 2022 | CF | UGA | Uche Ikpeazu | Cardiff City | End of season | |
| 1 February 2022 | CM | ENG | Lewis Wing | Wycombe Wanderers | End of season | |
| 5 March 2022 | CM | ENG | Connor Malley | Gateshead | End of season | |

=== Transfers out ===
| Date | Position | Nationality | Name | To | Fee | Source |
|---|---|---|---|---|---|---|
| 30 June 2021 | GK | SCO | Jordan Archer | Queens Park Rangers | Released | |
| 30 June 2021 | FW | COD | Britt Assombalonga | Adana Demirspor | Released | |
| 30 June 2021 | FW | ENG | Ashley Fletcher | Watford | Released | |
| 30 June 2021 | FW | ENG | Marvin Johnson | Sheffield Wednesday | Released | |
| 30 June 2021 | FW | IRL | Cole Kiernan | | Released | |
| 30 June 2021 | FW | ENG | Nathaniel Mendez-Laing | Sheffield Wednesday | Released | |
| 30 June 2021 | FW | ENG | Tyrone O'Neill | Scunthorpe United | Released | |
| 30 June 2021 | MF | ENG | George Waites | | Released | |
| 30 June 2021 | DF | ENG | Tyler Williams | | Released | |
| 30 June 2021 | DF | ENG | Andrew Wilson | | Released | |
| 2 July 2021 | MF | ENG | George Saville | Millwall | Undisclosed | |
| 31 August 2021 | MF | EGY | Sam Morsy | Ipswich Town | Undisclosed | |
| 11 January 2022 | LB | FRA | Williams Kokolo | Burton Albion | Undisclosed | |
| 31 January 2022 | AM | ENG | Marcus Browne | Oxford United | Undisclosed | |
