= Sol Bamba =

Football player and manager (1985–2024)

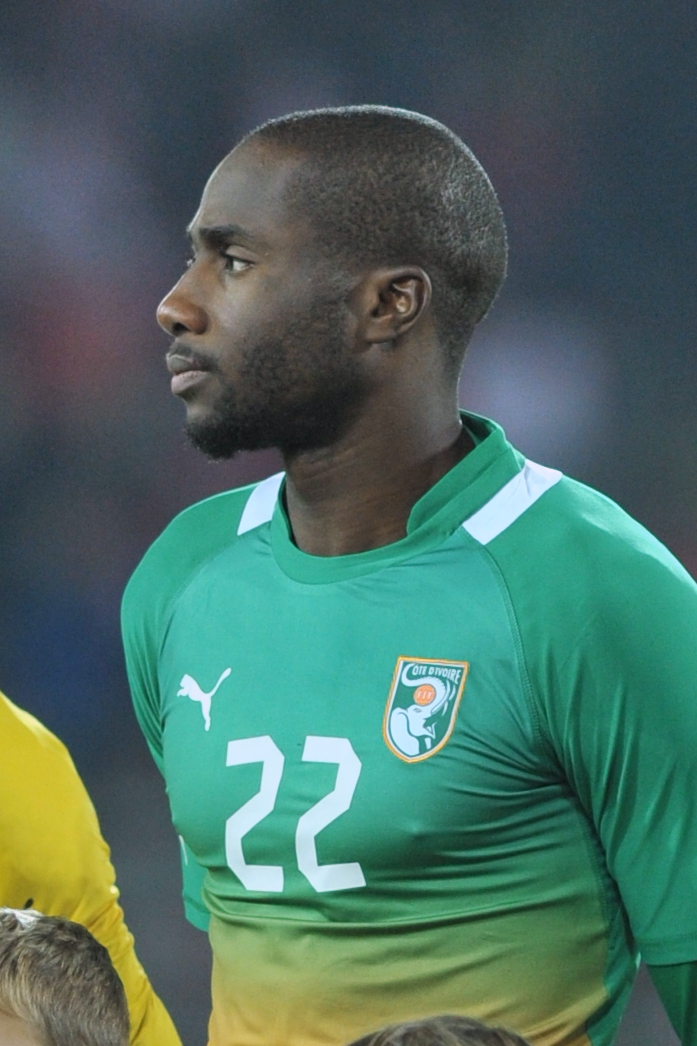
- Bamba with the Ivory Coast in 2012

Personal information
- Full name: Souleymane Bamba
- Date of birth: 13 January 1985
- Place of birth: Ivry-sur-Seine, France
- Date of death: 31 August 2024 (aged 39)
- Place of death: Manisa, Turkey
- Height: 1.90 m (6 ft 3 in)
- Position: Centre-back

Youth career
- 1996–2004: Paris Saint-Germain

Senior career*
Years	Team	Apps	(Gls)
2004–2006	Paris Saint-Germain	1	(0)
2006–2008	Dunfermline Athletic	39	(0)
2008–2011	Hibernian	75	(4)
2011–2012	Leicester City	52	(3)
2012–2014	Trabzonspor	27	(0)
2014–2015	Palermo	1	(0)
2015	→ Leeds United (loan)	19	(1)
2015–2016	Leeds United	32	(4)
2016–2021	Cardiff City	112	(10)
2021–2022	Middlesbrough	24	(0)
Total		382	(22)

International career
2003–2005	Ivory Coast U20		
2008	Ivory Coast U23	2	(0)
2008–2014	Ivory Coast	46	(1)

Managerial career
- 2024: Adanaspor
- * Club domestic league appearances and goals

Souleymane "Sol" Bamba (13 January 1985 – 31 August 2024) was a professional football player and manager. As a player, he was a centre-back. Born in France, he played for the Ivory Coast national team.

Bamba started his career in his native France with Paris Saint-Germain, but failed to establish himself in their first team. He moved to Scotland to join Dunfermline Athletic in 2006, helping the club reach the final of the Scottish Cup in his first season. Two years later, he was transferred to Hibernian, before joining English side Leicester City in January 2011.

Bamba was transferred to Turkish club Trabzonspor in 2012 for £750,000 before joining Palermo. However, he was loaned to Leeds United after making only one appearance in six months. He eventually joined Leeds on a permanent deal and was appointed club captain, spending a further year with the club before being released and subsequently joining Cardiff City. In his first full season with Cardiff, he helped the side win promotion to the Premier League. He retired in 2022 after one year at Middlesbrough, and was assistant manager of Cardiff in 2023 and manager of Adanaspor in Turkey at the time of his death.

Born in France to Ivorian parents, Bamba represented Ivory Coast in the 2008 Olympic Games and earned 46 caps for the senior international team between 2008 and 2014. He was chosen for two World Cups and three Africa Cup of Nations, finishing as a runner-up in the latter in 2012.

== Club career ==
=== Paris Saint-Germain ===
Bamba began his career with Ligue 1 club Paris Saint-Germain (PSG) at the age of 11. He had been spotted by club scouts playing street football in Paris but had initially turned the club down as his mother hoped for him to become a doctor. He lived with his parents Sehrata and Bakary Bamba in Ivry-sur-Seine, a suburb in central Paris. Since his family could not afford the travel to the club's training facilities outside the city, he moved away from his family home to instead live at the club's academy. Originally playing as a defensive midfielder, he converted to playing as a central defender at the age of 15 after impressing there as cover for a teammate who had missed a match due to being stuck in traffic.

Despite impressing for PSG's youth and B teams, he only appeared in two first team games, in his final year at the club at the age of 21. Dissatisfied with his lack of appearances, Bamba asked to be sent out on loan to gain experience but was denied by manager, Vahid Halilhodžić, causing Bamba to reject PSG's offer of a new contract and subsequently leave the club. He later claimed that PSG had damaged potential transfers to other French sides after he left the club, stating "I was disappointed because my club said, 'He's a good player but he's a tough guy – he doesn't listen and he can get the team into trouble."

=== Dunfermline Athletic ===
After an initial trial period, Bamba signed for Scottish Premier League side Dunfermline Athletic in July 2006 on a two-year contract. Jim Leishman later revealed that he had been intending to bring over another player from France on trial, but this deal fell through and Bamba's agent sent him instead. Leishman was immediately impressed by Bamba's physique and his performance as a trialist during a preseason friendly against West Bromwich Albion striker John Hartson. He made his competitive debut for the club in Dunfermline's opening league match of the season, a 2–1 defeat to Hearts. On 2 December 2006, Bamba was sent off for the first time in his professional career after pushing Steven Naismith in the chest during a 5–1 defeat to Kilmarnock.

In his first season at the club, Bamba was part of the squad that reached the 2007 Scottish Cup Final and played in a 1–0 defeat to Celtic in the final. However, the club also suffered relegation from the Scottish Premier League after a seven-year spell in the division. Bamba signed a two-year contract extension at the start of the 2007–08 season. The extension brought an end to rumours of his desire to leave the club in order to play at a higher level and further his chances of breaking into the Ivory Coast national side, having not played in any of Dunfermline's preseason matches.

Bamba was allowed to go on trial with Championship side Watford in July 2008, appearing in a friendly for them against Boreham Wood. Soon afterwards, manager Jim McIntyre said he expected a fee to be agreed between Dunfermline and Watford, which would allow Bamba to move to the Championship side. The deal was thought to be almost complete, with Watford sending a doctor to China, where Bamba had travelled with the Ivory Coast Olympic squad, to conduct his medical. However, Watford later pulled out for unknown reasons. A few weeks later, Dunfermline accepted offers of £50,000 for Bamba to move to either Hibernian and Motherwell, keeping him in the Scottish Premier League.

=== Hibernian ===
Bamba chose to move to Hibernian, signing a three-year contract with the club. As part of the transfer deal, Dunfermline were due 10% of any future transfer fee. He was sent off on his debut for a second bookable offence against Dundee United, but Bamba subsequently established himself in the Hibs first team. Despite being a natural centre back, manager Mixu Paatelainen praised Bamba's performance as a defensive midfielder during a 2–0 win over Celtic in December 2008. Paatelainen commented further that he believed Bamba had improved as a player since his spell at Dunfermline, with him no longer going to ground when making a challenge, and described him as possessing "tremendous pace and physical presence." Bamba quickly became a popular player with the Hibs support due to his tough and committed tackling in this new role.

After Rob Jones left the club and new manager John Hughes arrived during the summer of 2009, Bamba was moved back to a central defensive role. In his second match in this position, Bamba scored his first ever professional goal in a 3–1 win against Falkirk on 22 August, heading in from a John Rankin corner. Coincidentally, he scored his second goal for the club at the same ground against the same team and in another 3–1 win, on 27 March. The Edinburgh Evening News reported on 8 May 2010 that Bamba's performances had "not gone unnoticed", with scouts from Fulham and Rennes due to watch Bamba. Sven-Göran Eriksson, the new manager of the Ivorian national team, was also due to watch Bamba ahead of the 2010 World Cup, but was not spotted at the last game played by Hibs in the 2009–10 season.

Bamba angered manager John Hughes when he failed to report for a pre-season tour of the Netherlands in July 2010. Bamba responded angrily to the criticism by claiming that he needed a full three weeks off after returning from the World Cup and had attempted to contact both Hughes and Hibernian's chairman to discuss the situation, but Hughes dropped Bamba from the first team squad when he eventually returned to Edinburgh. Bamba was made to train with the club's youth team on his return but was recalled for the second leg of a UEFA Europa League tie with NK Maribor at Easter Road, which Hibs lost 3–2 on the night and 6–2 on aggregate. Following the incident, manager Hughes stated his desire for the situation to be forgotten. During his time with Hibs, Bamba made 80 appearances in all competitions, scoring four times.

=== Leicester City ===
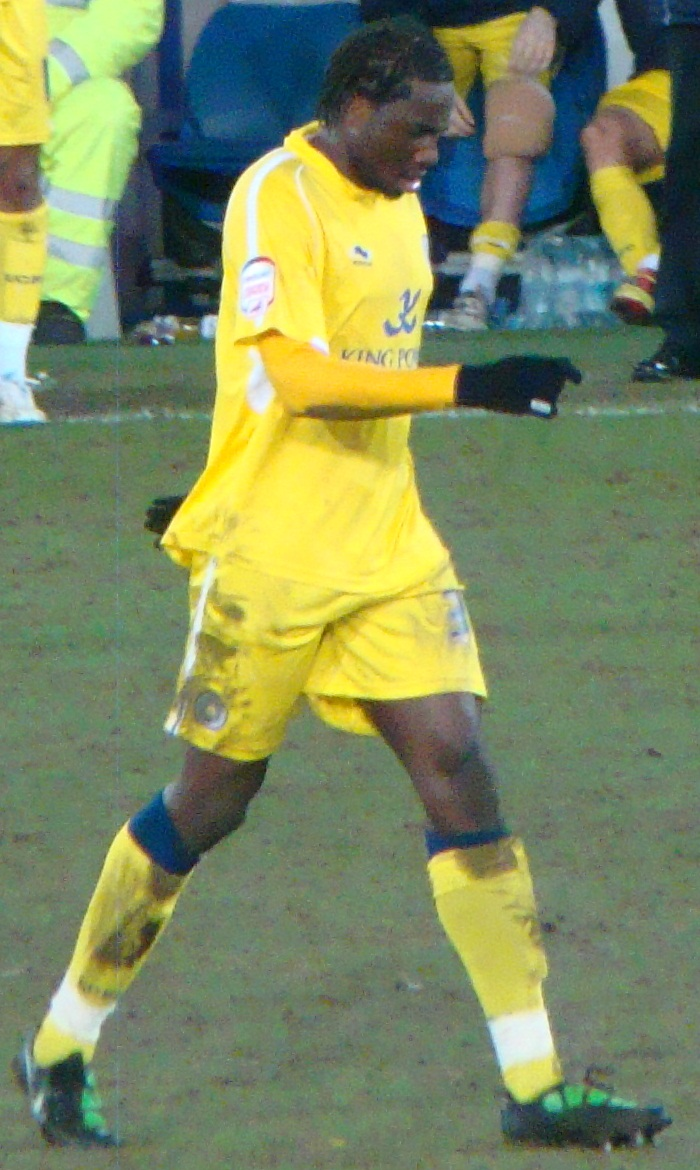
Bamba playing for Leicester City in 2011

With Bamba's contract with Hibs due to expire at the end of the 2010–11 season, the club agreed on a deal with Football League Championship club Leicester City for his transfer. The deal was confirmed on 2 January 2011, with Bamba joining for an undisclosed fee midway through the season, although sources placed the figure around £250,000 with Hibs also due to receive a percentage of any future transfer fee. He was reunited at Leicester with his former Ivory Coast manager, Sven-Göran Eriksson. He made his debut for the club in a 2–2 draw against Manchester City on 9 January in the third round of the FA Cup, scoring with his first touch of the ball. He scored his first two league goals in a 4–2 win over Millwall on 22 January.

After speculation linking him with several Premier League sides, including Blackburn Rovers, and French side Marseille during the 2011 summer transfer window, Bamba signed a new contract with Leicester in September 2011. During negotiations, Eriksson compared Bamba's style of play to that of former German international player Franz Beckenbauer. Blackburn manager Steve Kean had claimed that the two clubs had made a bid for Bamba and described the move as being "quite close" to being completed.

After Eriksson was replaced by Nigel Pearson as Leicester manager, Bamba played less regularly, particularly after January when the club signed Wes Morgan and Bamba missed a month to play in the African Cup of Nations with Ivory Coast. In his 17 months at the club, in total he played 55 games for the club in all competitions, scoring four goals. He later expressed his regret at leaving the club, stating his belief in Pearson's ability to help them win promotion to the Premier League.

=== Trabzonspor ===
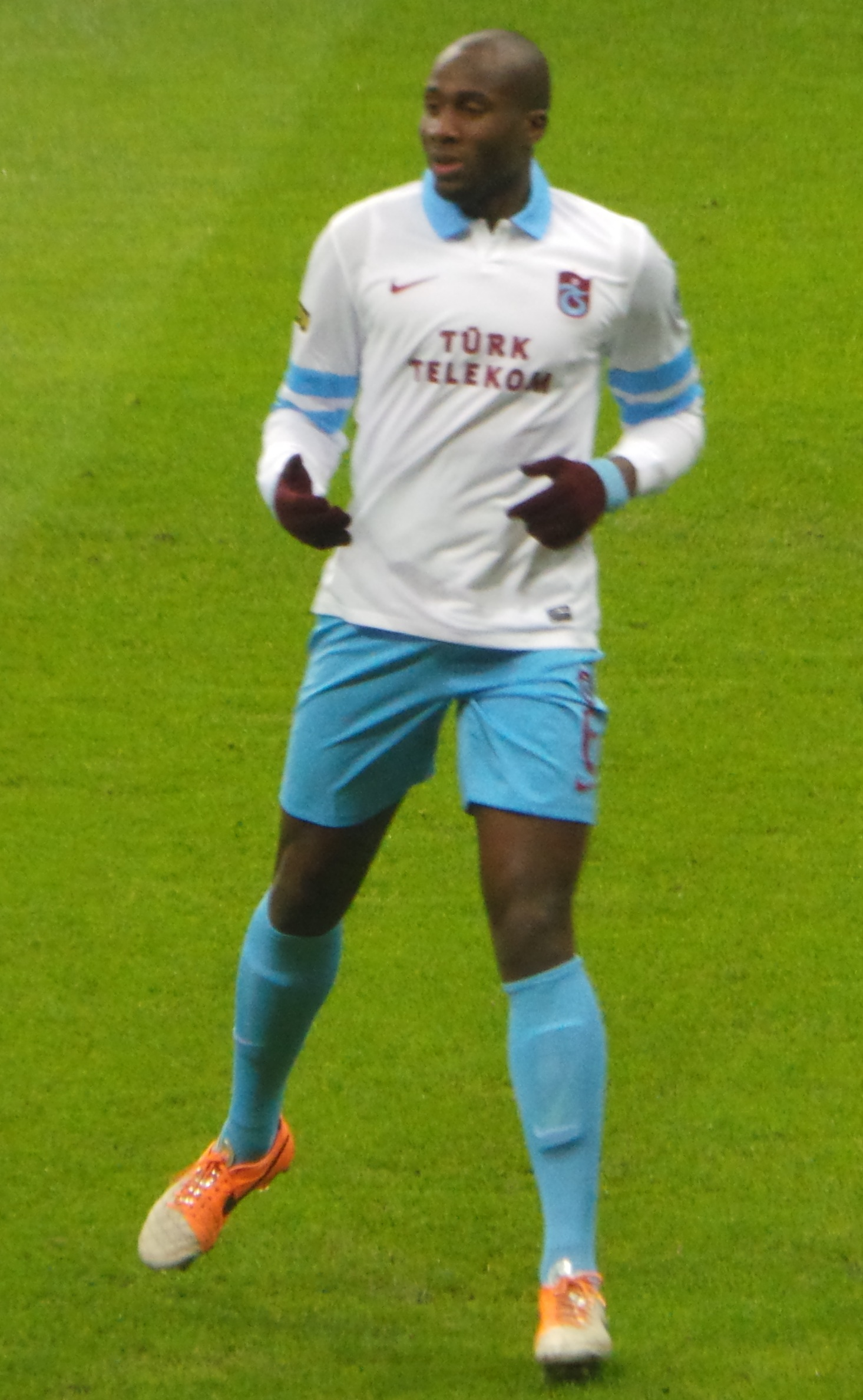
Bamba playing for Trabzonspor in 2013

Bamba signed for Turkish club Trabzonspor in June 2012 for a fee of £750,000 after being recommended to the club by his international teammate Didier Zokora. He made his debut for the club on 26 August 2012 playing the full 90 minutes, in a 2–0 victory at home to Elazigspor. He only made 18 appearances during his first season at the club, missing a proportion of fixtures in December and January in part because he was away with Ivory Coast as they qualified for the 2013 African Cup of Nations.

During the 2013–14 season, Bamba made 15 appearances for Trabzonspor in the first half of the season, including being a regular starter in their Europa League campaign. However, on 22 January 2014, he picked up an ankle injury which ruled him out for the majority of the latter part of the season. Bamba was not selected to play for Tranzonspor again after suffering the injury, however he recovered in time to play for Ivory Coast at the 2014 FIFA World Cup.

=== Palermo ===
On 26 August 2014, after having been released by Trabzonspor, Bamba agreed a three-year deal with newly promoted Serie A club Palermo. He made his Palermo debut on 24 September 2014, when he started in a 3–3 draw against Napoli. However, he made no further appearances for the club. After leaving the club, he expressed his confusion over not playing more for Palermo, commenting "The manager would say 'you're not far off, keep doing what you're doing and you'll be playing.' Well, after one month then two, three and four you start to get worried."

=== Leeds United ===
On 23 January 2015, less than six months into his Palermo contract, Bamba was loaned to Championship side Leeds United for the remainder of the season, with the possibility of making the transfer permanent at a later date. He made his debut for Leeds in a 2–1 West Yorkshire derby win over Huddersfield Town a week later. Less than a month after joining the side, Bamba was named captain for three games in place of Liam Cooper. In particular, he served as captain when Leeds beat the then league leaders Middlesbrough 1–0, with Bamba receiving praise for his performance.

Bamba scored his first goal for Leeds against Fulham in a 3–0 away victory in March. After impressing during his time at Leeds, Bamba revealed his desire to join the club on a permanent basis. However, he was also outspoken towards the club's owner Massimo Cellino advising "the person in charge has to do better for the sake of the club and the supporters". In June, Leeds arranged with Bamba's club Palermo to sign him on a permanent basis for an undisclosed fee. The deal was for two years with the option for a third year. New Leeds United head coach Uwe Rösler described Bamba as "a match-winner in both boxes", and said that "he brings fantastic qualities with him" and "he can be a leader by himself for the young team he is working with".

In the offseason, Bamba was appointed captain of Leeds by head coach Uwe Rösler, taking over from previous captain Liam Cooper. Bamba received the man of the match award in a 1–1 draw against Burnley in the league on the opening day of the season. Bamba scored a "stunning" long range volley against Wolverhampton Wanderers in a 2–1 win late in the season. At the end of the 2015–16 season, Bamba was again critical of Leeds owner Cellino, calling on him to put 'promises to action'. He revealed the players were unaware if head coach Steve Evans would be retained for the following 2016–17 season, that the players were unaware of when to return for pre season training and they were told they would find out 'by text' when Cellino had made a decision.

Nonetheless, new head coach Garry Monk announced Bamba would remain as Leeds captain for the 2016–17 season. On 7 August, Bamba scored an own goal against Queens Park Rangers in a 3–0 defeat in the opening match of the season and was subsequently dropped from the side, falling behind Kyle Bartley, Liam Cooper and Pontus Jansson in the pecking order. On 1 September 2016, Bamba, despite being Leeds' captain, was released by the club. His contract was cancelled by mutual consent following the close of the transfer window the previous day. The decision was made after Monk informed him that he would no longer be first choice at the club.

=== Cardiff City ===
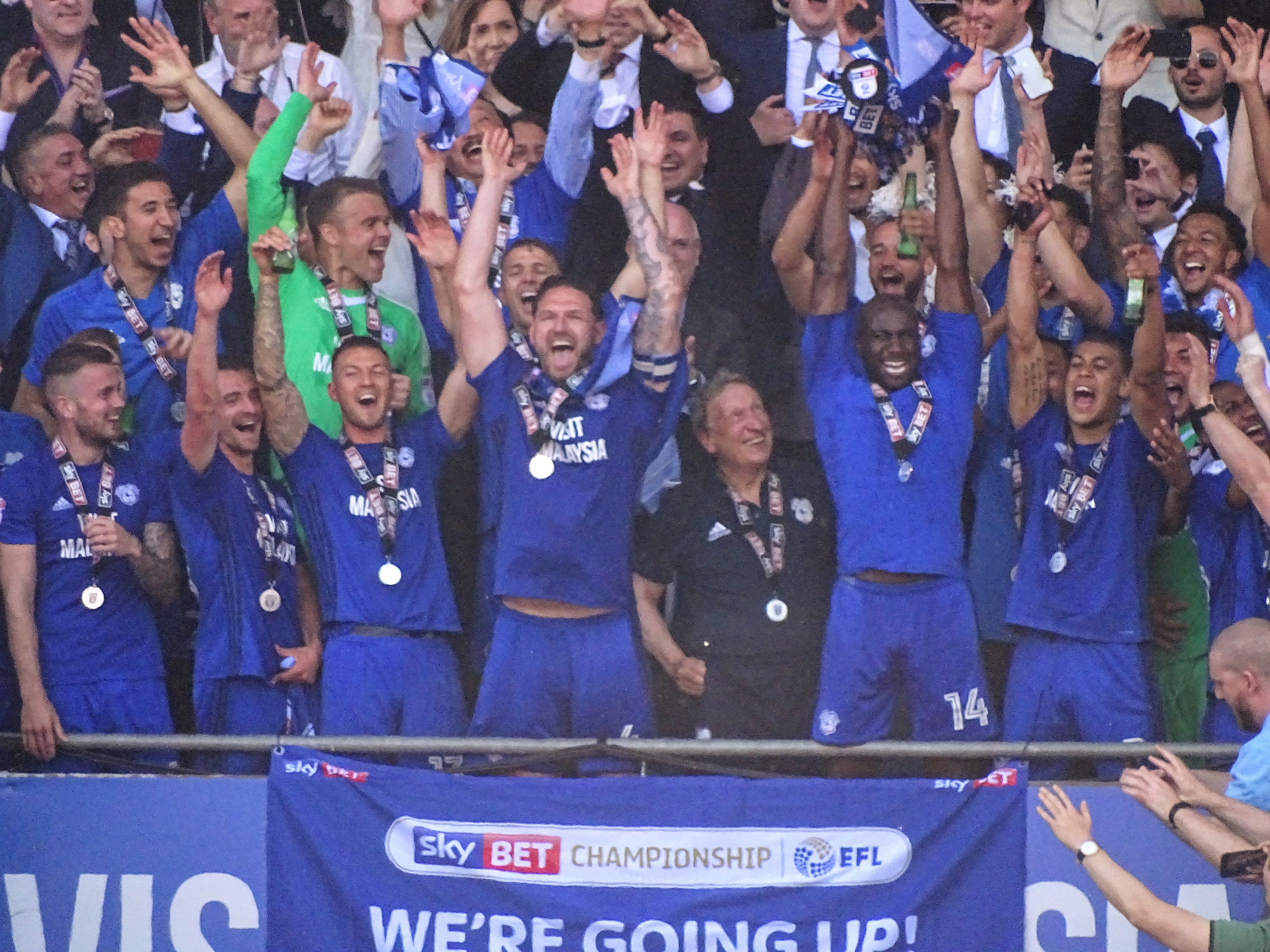
Bamba (holding trophy) lifts the 2017–18 EFL Championship runner-up trophy

Following his release, Bamba trained with Derby County who were managed by his former Leicester boss Nigel Pearson but was not offered a deal. He instead joined Neil Warnock at Cardiff City in October 2016, signing a two-year contract. Warnock had long been keen on signing Bamba at previous clubs and had contacted him a month before the move, when both were without a club, and urged him to wait for Warnock's appointment at a new club to join him there. He made his debut for the club in a Severnside derby match against Bristol City on 14 October, scoring the winning goal as the Bluebirds won 2–1. His performances for Cardiff led manager Warnock to declare that "I wouldn't want anyone else. I don't think there's anyone better." Bamba received his first red card in seven years against Ipswich Town in December, following a scuffle with forward, David McGoldrick. After receiving the red card, Bamba clashed with the fourth official before being physically restrained by Warnock and leaving the pitch. His reaction led to a three match ban. In April, Bamba suffered a groin injury against Barnsley, which ended his season prematurely.

Bamba returned to the squad at the beginning of the 2017–18 season, helping Cardiff win their three opening games of the season, for the first time in their history. He signed a new three-year contract on 25 August 2017, following it up by heading in the winner against Queens Park Rangers the next day. He went on to help the club win promotion to the Premier League after finishing the season in second place. He was ever present in the league, appearing in all 46 league matches, and was named in the PFA Championship Team of the Year.

He made his debut in the Premier League in Cardiff's first match of the 2018–19 season, a 2–0 defeat to AFC Bournemouth, before scoring his first goal in the top division in a 4–1 defeat to Chelsea in September 2018. Bamba scored a further 3 goals during the season, including in wins against Brighton & Hove Albion and Southampton. Having missed only one match during the course of the season, he was ruled out for the remainder of the campaign after rupturing his cruciate knee ligaments in a defeat against Wolverhampton Wanderers on 5 March 2019.

In July 2019 it was revealed that Bamba would miss the start of the 2019–20 season due to injury. He made his return from injury as a substitute on 2 November in a 4–2 home win over Birmingham City and in December he signed a new contract adding one year to his deal. After a cancer diagnosis in January 2021, Bamba returned for the final minute of the season on 8 May in a 1–1 draw at home to Rotherham United. In June 2021, Cardiff announced that Bamba was one of five players to be released. He said that he was upset to have learned the news from the club's Twitter post.

=== Middlesbrough ===
Bamba was re-united with former manager Neil Warnock after joining Middlesbrough on a one-year contract on 10 August 2021. He made his first start for the club one day later in a 3–0 defeat away to Blackpool in the EFL Cup. His first league start came in a 2–0 defeat away to Coventry City on 11 September 2021. Bamba won the Sky Bet Man of the Match award for his performance in a 2–0 victory against his former club Cardiff City on 23 October 2021.

On 4 February 2022, Bamba came on as a substitute in the 28th minute of extra time in Middlesbrough's FA Cup tie against Manchester United. Upon the game going to penalties, he took and converted his team's fifth spot kick and ultimately allowed the Boro to progress to the fifth round of the tournament for the first time since 2015. Bamba was released by the club at the end of the 2021–22 season.

== International career ==
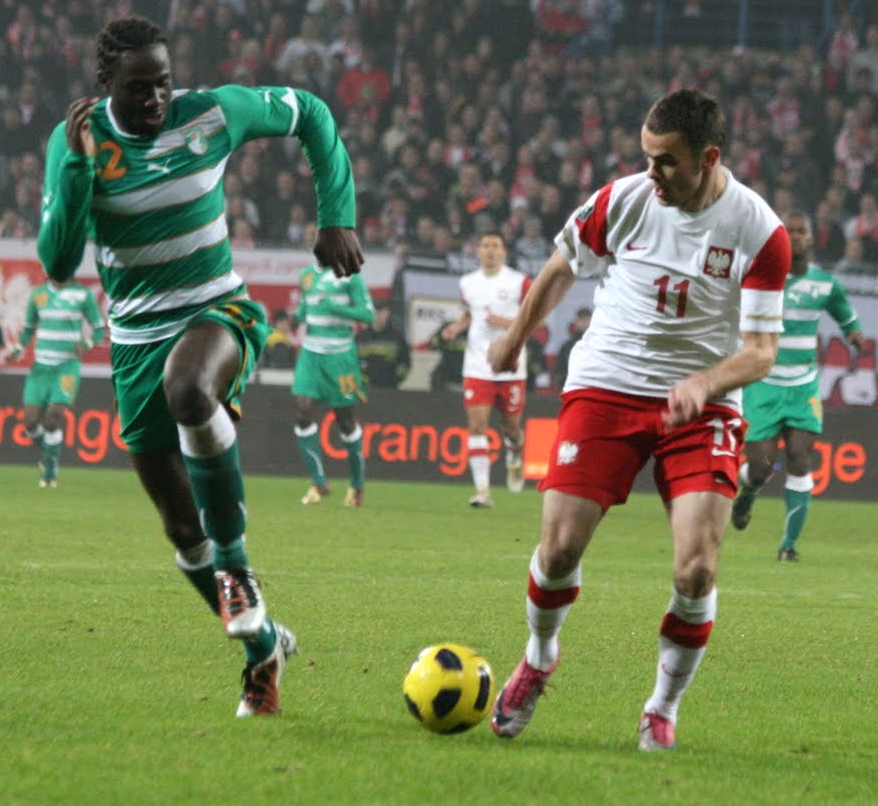
Bamba (left) playing for Ivory Coast in a friendly match against Poland in 2010.

Although born in France, Bamba represented his parents' nation of Ivory Coast. He featured at the 2003 FIFA World Youth Championship, the 2005 African Youth Championship and the 2008 Toulon Tournament. Bamba was also part of the Ivory Coast squad that reached the quarter-finals of the 2008 Olympic Games.

Bamba won his first cap at full international level for Ivory Coast in a 2008 friendly match against Israel, and his second cap as a late substitute in a friendly against Turkey. Bamba made his competitive debut in a 5–0 win against Malawi in a 2010 FIFA World Cup qualifying match, again as a late substitute. This match was played in the aftermath of the Houphouët-Boigny Arena stampede, which killed dozens of Ivorian spectators. Bamba became a regular in the national team as they qualified for the 2010 Africa Cup of Nations and the 2010 FIFA World Cup. Bamba scored his first goal for the team in a friendly against Rwanda, as part of the squad's preparation for the 2010 African Cup. He played in all of Ivory Coast's matches at the 2010 Africa Cup of Nations, but the team suffered a quarter-final defeat to Algeria after extra time. The "uneasy" central defensive partnership between Kolo Touré and Bamba was cited as one of the reasons for their defeat. The tournament had been played in the shadow of the shooting of the Togo team bus, however, with death threats also being made against the Ivory Coast team.

Manager Vahid Halilhodžić, who had worked with Bamba at PSG and given him his first appearances at club and international level, was sacked after the tournament. The new Ivorian coach, Sven-Göran Eriksson, selected Bamba in his provisional 30-man squad for the 2010 World Cup on 11 May. Bamba scored in Eriksson's first match in charge, a 2–2 draw with Paraguay. Bamba was selected in the Ivory Coast's 23-man World Cup squad, but was dropped from the starting lineup, with midfielder Didier Zokora chosen to partner with Kolo Touré in central defence.

Bamba resumed his partnership with Touré at the 2012 Africa Cup of Nations. Ivory Coast did not concede a goal during the entire tournament, but lost the final against Zambia on a penalty shootout. At the 2014 FIFA World Cup, Bamba played in central defence alongside Zokora after Touré contracted malaria before the tournament. Bamba was booked in the first match, which Ivory Coast won 2–1 against Japan. Ivory Coast were eliminated at the group stage after suffering 2–1 defeats against both Colombia and Greece.

Bamba was called up to the squad for 10 September 2014 fixture against Cameroon, however on 29 December 2014 he was a surprising omission from the Ivory Coast squad for the 2015 Africa Cup of Nations. Although he did not retire from international football, Bamba did not appear for the national side after 2014.

== Coaching career ==
Bamba was appointed assistant manager of Cardiff City in January 2023. He was appointed by the incoming Sabri Lamouchi, who managed him for the Ivory Coast between 2012 and 2014. He left the club in June 2023 as Erol Bulut came in as manager.

He was appointed head coach of Adanaspor in July 2024, who he managed until his death the following month.

== Style of play ==
I love defending. Absolutely love it. When I go into a game I set myself a target: I don't want to lose a header anywhere on the pitch. Sometimes I see defenders and I ask myself: 'Does he actually like defending?' But I love going into a tackle, winning a challenge or a header. That's why it's good here because the fans appreciate that. In France or in Italy, when you do a good defensive tackle, they're not bothered. But here they like that and that makes me want to defend even more.

— Bamba on the art of defending, 2018

Chiefly a centre-back, Bamba played as a defensive midfielder during his emergence at PSG, before becoming a centre-back at age 15. He had sporadically played in the midfield since then, most successfully for Mixu Paatelainen at Hibs.

Jim Leishman, who signed Bamba at Dunfermline Athletic, said of his former charge in 2010: "He's certainly got the physique and he's got the potential to do it. But potential sometimes passes you by, it's all about going out and doing it. He's a great runner, he's as strong as an ox, and he's a strong tackler." Sky Sports' Soriebah Kajue in September 2011 said Bamba "established himself as a rock at the heart of the Foxes defence and has produced a level of consistency this year that has simply been outstanding", paying tribute to "Bamba's burgeoning reputation as a ball-playing defender".

Sven-Göran Eriksson, who managed Bamba at club level for Leicester City and internationally for the Ivory Coast, compared the defender with Franz Beckenbauer. Cardiff manager Neil Warnock regularly told Bamba "Don't be Beckenbauer. Just kick or head it. When it's on, pass it, but if it's not on, just put it up there", and in December 2017 Warnock branded Bamba and fellow Cardiff centre-half Sean Morrison as better than Virgil van Dijk. Bamba's favourite players growing up were Lilian Thuram and George Weah.

== Personal life and death ==
Bamba met his English wife Chloe while playing for Leicester. He had three children. One son was born in 2009 from a relationship with a Scottish woman. Bamba was multilingual, being able to speak English, French, Italian, Turkish and "the Ivorian dialect that his father used at home". In 2021, he was diagnosed with non-Hodgkin lymphoma and began undergoing chemotherapy treatment. Four months later in May 2021, he announced that he was cancer-free. However, his wife revealed in a statement made shortly after his death that he had cancer for "the last few years".

On 30 August 2024, Bamba fell ill after the Adanaspor match against Manisa F.K. and was rushed into Manisa Celal Bayar University Hospital. He died the following day, at the age of 39.

== Career statistics ==
=== Club ===
Appearances and goals by club, season and competition
Club	Season	League			National cup (Note: Includes Scottish Cup, FA Cup, Turkish Cup)		League cup (Note: Includes Scottish League Cup, EFL Cup)		Europe		Other		Total	
Club	Season	Division	Apps	Goals	Apps	Goals	Apps	Goals	Apps	Goals	Apps	Goals	Apps	Goals
Paris Saint-Germain	2004–05	Ligue 1	1	0	0	0	0	0	0	0	0	0	1	0
Paris Saint-Germain	2005–06	Ligue 1	0	0	0	0	0	0	—		—		0	0
Paris Saint-Germain	Total		1	0	0	0	0	0	0	0	0	0	1	0
Dunfermline Athletic	2006–07	Scottish Premier League	23	0	5	0	2	0	—		—		30	0
Dunfermline Athletic	2007–08	Scottish First Division	15	0	0	0	1	0	2	0	2 (Note: Appearance(s) in Scottish Challenge Cup)	0	20	0
Dunfermline Athletic	2008–09	Scottish First Division	1	0	0	0	0	0	—		0	0	1	0
Dunfermline Athletic	Total		39	0	5	0	3	0	2	0	2	0	51	0
Hibernian	2008–09	Scottish Premier League	29	0	1	0	0	0	0	0	—		30	0
Hibernian	2009–10	Scottish Premier League	30	2	1	0	1	0	—		—		32	2
Hibernian	2010–11	Scottish Premier League	16	2	0	0	1	0	1	0	—		18	2
Hibernian	Total		75	4	2	0	2	0	1	0	—		80	4
Leicester City	2010–11	Championship	16	2	2	1	0	0	—		—		18	3
Leicester City	2011–12	Championship	36	1	1	0	0	0	—		—		37	1
Leicester City	Total		52	3	3	1	0	0	—		—		55	4
Trabzonspor	2012–13	Süper Lig	18	0	0	0	—		2	0	—		20	0
Trabzonspor	2013–14	Süper Lig	9	0	1	0	—		5	0	—		15	0
Trabzonspor	Total		27	0	1	0	—		7	0	—		35	0
Palermo	2014–15	Serie A	1	0	0	0	—		—		—		1	0
Leeds United	2014–15 (Note: This season was spent on loan from Palermo)	Championship	19	1	0	0	0	0	—		—		19	1
Leeds United	2015–16	Championship	30	4	3	0	0	0	—		—		33	4
Leeds United	2016–17	Championship	2	0	0	0	2	0	—		—		4	0
Leeds United	Total		51	5	3	0	2	0	—		—		56	5
Cardiff City	2016–17	Championship	26	2	1	0	0	0	—		—		27	2
Cardiff City	2017–18	Championship	46	4	0	0	0	0	—		—		46	4
Cardiff City	2018–19	Premier League	28	4	0	0	0	0	—		—		28	4
Cardiff City	2019–20	Championship	6	0	4	0	0	0	—		0	0	10	0
Cardiff City	2020–21	Championship	6	0	0	0	1	0	—		—		7	0
Cardiff City	Total		112	10	5	0	1	0	—		0	0	118	10
Middlesbrough	2021–22	Championship	24	0	4	0	1	0	—		—		29	0
Career total			382	22	23	1	9	0	10	0	2	0	426	23

=== International ===
Appearances and goals by national team and year
National team	Year	Apps	Goals
Ivory Coast	2008	1	0
Ivory Coast	2009	8	0
Ivory Coast	2010	6	1
Ivory Coast	2011	1	0
Ivory Coast	2012	13	0
Ivory Coast	2013	10	0
Ivory Coast	2014	7	0
Total		46	1

=== Managerial ===
As of 31 August 2024

Team	From	To	Record							
Team	From	To	P	W	D	L	GF	GA	GD	W%
Adanaspor	25 July 2024	31 August 2024	4	1	1	2	6	11	−5	25.0
Total			4	1	1	2	6	11	−5	25.0

== Honours ==
Dunfermline Athletic

- Scottish Cup runner-up: 2006–07

Cardiff City

- EFL Championship runner-up: 2017–18

Ivory Coast

- Africa Cup of Nations runner-up: 2012

Individual

- PFA Team of the Year: 2017–18 Championship
- Leeds United Player of the Month: August 2015
