= Ntazana Mayembe =

Zambian footballer (born 2003)

Personal information
- Date of birth: 26 January 2003 (age 23)
- Place of birth: Bridgend, Wales
- Position: Winger

Team information
- Current team: Garw SBGC

Youth career
- 2010–2020: Cardiff City

Senior career*
Years	Team	Apps	(Gls)
2020–2022	Cardiff City	0	(0)
2023	Goytre United	1	(0)
2023	Garw SBGC	3	(1)

International career^{‡}
2021	Zambia	2	(0)
- * Club domestic league appearances and goals as of 23 September 2023 (UTC) ‡ National team caps and goals as of 15:12, 10 June 2021 (UTC)

Ntazana Mayembe (born 5 April 2003) is a footballer who plays as a winger for Garw S.B.G.C. Born in Wales, he has previously represented the Zambia national team.

== Career ==
Mayembe joined the youth academy of Cardiff City at the age of 10. In January 2020, he signed his first professional contract with Cardiff. He made the bench for Cardiff City for the first time on 29 January 2020. On 10 June 2022 Cardiff announced that Mayembe would be leaving the club on 30 June when his contract expired.

== International career ==
Born in Wales, Mayembe is of Zambian descent. He has been called up to represent both England and Wales at schoolboy level. Mayembe debuted for the Zambia national team in a friendly 3–1 loss to Senegal on 5 June 2021.
