= 2016–17 Cardiff City F.C. season =

Welsh football club season

Cardiff City
2016–17 season
- Owner: Vincent Tan
- Chairman: Mehmet Dalman
- Manager: Paul Trollope (until 4 October); Neil Warnock (from 5 October)
- Stadium: Cardiff City Stadium
- Championship: 12th
- FA Cup: Third round
- EFL Cup: First round
- Top goalscorer: League: Kenneth Zohore (12); All: Kenneth Zohore (12)
- Highest home attendance: 23,153 (Vs. Newcastle United, 28 April )
- Lowest home attendance: 5,911 (Vs. Fulham, 8 Jan)
- Average home league attendance: 16,564
Home colours	Away colours

The 2016–17 season was Cardiff City's 118th season in their existence and the 89th in the Football League. Along with competing in the Championship, the club also participated in the FA Cup and League Cup. It was Paul Trollope's first season in charge since replacing Russell Slade as head coach. Trollope was sacked on 5 October, whilst Cardiff were in the relegation zone, their lowest position in 11 years, and was replaced with Neil Warnock. The season covers the period from 1 July 2016 to 30 June 2017.

== Kit ==
Supplier: adidas
Sponsor(s): Visit Malaysia

Home	Away

Last updated: 28 August 2016.
Source: Historical Football Kits

== First-Team squad ==
No.	Name	Pos.	Nat.	Place of Birth	Age	Apps	Goals	Signed from	Date signed	Fee	Ends
Goalkeepers
1	Allan McGregor	GK	(Scotland)	Edinburgh	44	19	0	Hull City	18 January 2017	Loan	2017
21	Ben Amos	GK	(England)	Macclesfield	36	16	0	Bolton Wanderers	26 August 2016	Loan	2017
28	Brian Murphy	GK	(Republic of Ireland)	Waterford	43	6	0	Portsmouth	2 September 2016	Free	2018
Defenders
2	Lee Peltier	RB	(England)	Liverpool	40	87	0	Huddersfield Town	24 January 2015	Nominal	2019
3	Joe Bennett	LB	(England)	Rochdale	36	25	3	Aston Villa	27 August 2016	Free	2019
4	Sean Morrison	CB	(England)	Plymouth	35	119	13	Reading	15 August 2014	£2,620,000	2018
5	Bruno Ecuele Manga	CB	(Gabon)	Libreville	38	78	5	Lorient	1 September 2014	£4,400,000	2019
6	Jazz Richards	RB	(Wales)	Swansea	35	28	0	Fulham	19 July 2016	Swap Deal	2019
12	Declan John	LB	(Wales)	Merthyr Tydfil	31	47	0	Academy	1 June 2013	Trainee	2018
14	Sol Bamba	CB	(Ivory Coast) (France)	Ivry-sur-Seine	41	27	2	Free agent	11 October 2016	Free	2018
15	Greg Halford	RB/CB	(England)	Chelmsford	32	17	0	Rotherham United	6 January 2017	Nominal	2018
16	Matthew Connolly	CB	(England)	Barnet	39	158	7	Queens Park Rangers	22 August 2012	£500,000	2019
Midfielders
7	Peter Whittingham	CM	(England)	Nuneaton	42	460	100	Aston Villa	11 January 2007	£350,000	2017
8	Joe Ralls	CM	(England)	Aldershot	34	139	12	Academy	30 September 2011	Trainee	2019
11	Craig Noone	RW	(England)	Liverpool	39	170	19	Brighton & Hove Albion	30 August 2012	£1,000,000	2018
13	Anthony Pilkington	LW	(Republic of Ireland) (England)	Blackburn	38	98	18	Norwich City	15 August 2014	£875,000	2019
17	Aron Gunnarsson	CM	(Iceland)	Akureyri	38	238	23	Coventry City	8 July 2011	£350,000	2018
24	Kadeem Harris	LW	(England)	Westminster	33	61	6	Wycombe Wanderers	30 January 2012	£150,000	2019
31	Mark Harris	AM	(Wales)	Swansea	27	3	0	Academy	8 January 2017	Trainee	2019
33	Junior Hoilett	LW	(Canada)	Brampton	36	33	2	Free agent	10 October 2016	Free	2018
Forwards
9	Frédéric Gounongbe	CF	(Benin) (Belgium)	Brussels	38	12	0	Westerlo	1 July 2016	Free	2018
19	Rickie Lambert	CF	(England)	Kirkby	44	19	4	West Bromwich Albion	31 August 2016	£1,700,000	2018
26	Kenneth Zohore	CF	(Denmark)	Copenhagen	32	42	14	KV Kortrijk	6 July 2016	Undisclosed	2020
27	Ibrahim Meite	CF	(England)	London	22	1	0	Harrow Borough	6 January 2017	Undisclosed	2018
37	Rhys Healey	CF	(England)	Manchester	31	8	1	Connah's Quay Nomads	28 January 2013	£25,000	2018
Out on loan
18	Tom Adeyemi	CM	(England)	Norwich	35	23	1	Birmingham City	7 August 2014	£882,000	2017
20	Adam Le Fondre	CF	(England)	Stockport	39	25	3	Reading	28 May 2014	£2,170,000	2017
22	Stuart O'Keefe	CM	(England)	Eye	35	43	2	Crystal Palace	28 January 2015	£750,000	2019
23	Matthew Kennedy	RW	(Scotland)	Irvine	32	19	0	Everton	2 February 2015	Undisclosed	2018
25	Emyr Huws	DM	(Wales)	Llanelli	33	4	0	Wigan Athletic	12 August 2016	Undisclosed	2019
29	Semi Ajayi	CB	(Nigeria) (England)	London	33	0	0	Arsenal	1 July 2015	Free	2017
30	Ben Wilson	GK	(England)	Stanley	34	4	0	Accrington Stanley	November 2014	Free	2019
36	Deji Oshilaja	CB/RB	(England)	London	33	3	0	Academy	1 July 2012	Trainee	2017
39	Idriss Saadi	CF	(France)	Valence	34	2	0	Clermont	1 September 2015	Undisclosed	2018

Appearances and goals for the club are up to date as of 7 May 2017

=== Statistics ===
As of 7 May 2017

No.	Pos	Nat	Player	Total		Championship		FA Cup		League Cup	
No.	Pos	Nat	Player	Apps	Goals	Apps	Goals	Apps	Goals	Apps	Goals
1	GK	(Scotland) SCO	Allan McGregor (on loan from Hull City)	19	0	19+0	0	0+0	0	0+0	0
2	DF	(England) ENG	Lee Peltier	29	0	29+0	0	0+0	0	0+0	0
3	DF	(England) ENG	Joe Bennett	25	3	23+1	3	1+0	0	0+0	0
4	DF	(England) ENG	Sean Morrison	46	4	43+1	4	1+0	0	1+0	0
5	DF	(Gabon) GAB	Bruno Ecuele Manga	22	0	16+5	0	0+0	0	1+0	0
6	DF	(Wales) WAL	Jazz Richards	28	0	25+1	0	1+0	0	1+0	0
7	MF	(England) ENG	Peter Whittingham	37	7	28+9	7	0+0	0	0+0	0
8	MF	(England) ENG	Joe Ralls	44	6	39+3	6	1+0	0	1+0	0
9	FW	(Benin) BEN	Frédéric Gounongbe	12	0	3+8	0	0+0	0	0+1	0
11	MF	(England) ENG	Craig Noone	36	2	17+17	2	0+1	0	1+0	0
12	DF	(Wales) WAL	Declan John	16	0	9+6	0	0+0	0	1+0	0
13	MF	(Republic of Ireland) IRL	Anthony Pilkington	36	8	21+13	7	1+0	1	0+1	0
14	DF	(Ivory Coast) CIV	Sol Bamba	27	2	26+0	2	1+0	0	0+0	0
15	DF	(England) ENG	Greg Halford	17	0	9+7	0	1+0	0	0+0	0
16	DF	(England) ENG	Matthew Connolly	28	1	25+2	1	0+0	0	1+0	0
17	MF	(Iceland) ISL	Aron Gunnarsson	41	3	40+0	3	0+0	0	1+0	0
19	FW	(England) ENG	Rickie Lambert	19	4	14+4	4	1+0	0	0+0	0
21	GK	(England) ENG	Ben Amos (on loan from Bolton Wanderers)	16	0	16+0	0	0+0	0	0+0	0
24	MF	(England) ENG	Kadeem Harris	38	4	22+15	4	1+0	0	0+0	0
26	FW	(Denmark) DEN	Kenneth Zohore	30	12	24+5	12	0+0	0	1+0	0
27	FW	(England) ENG	Ibrahim Meite	1	0	0+1	0	0+0	0	0+0	0
28	GK	(Republic of Ireland) IRL	Brian Murphy	6	0	4+1	0	1+0	0	0+0	0
31	MF	(Wales) WAL	Mark Harris	3	0	1+1	0	0+1	0	0+0	0
33	MF	(Canada) CAN	Junior Hoilett	33	2	29+4	2	0+0	0	0+0	0
37	FW	(England) ENG	Rhys Healey	7	1	2+5	1	0+0	0	0+0	0
First team players out on loan:
22	MF	(England) ENG	Stuart O'Keefe (at Milton Keynes Dons)	10	0	3+5	0	0+1	0	1+0	0
23	MF	(Scotland) SCO	Matthew Kennedy (at Plymouth Argyle)	3	0	0+2	0	0+0	0	0+1	0
25	MF	(Wales) WAL	Emyr Huws (at Ipswich Town)	4	0	1+2	0	1+0	0	0+0	0
30	GK	(England) ENG	Ben Wilson (at Rochdale)	3	0	3+0	0	0+0	0	0+0	0
First team player(s) that left the club:
1	GK	(Scotland) SCO	David Marshall	4	0	4+0	0	0+0	0	0+0	0
10	MF	(Netherlands) NED	Lex Immers	13	0	10+3	0	0+0	0	0+0	0
15	MF	(England) ENG	Kieran Richardson	6	0	2+4	0	0+0	0	0+0	0
21	GK	(England) ENG	Simon Moore	1	0	0+0	0	0+0	0	1+0	0
27	FW	(Morocco) MAR	Marouane Chamakh	2	0	0+2	0	0+0	0	0+0	0

==== Goals record ====
As of 7 May 2017

Rank	No.	Nat.	Po.	Name	Championship	FA Cup	League Cup	Total
1	26	(Denmark)	CF	Kenneth Zohore	12	0	0	12
2	13	(Republic of Ireland)	LW	Anthony Pilkington	7	1	0	8
3	7	(England)	CM	Peter Whittingham	7	0	0	7
4	8	(England)	CM	Joe Ralls	6	0	0	6
5	4	(England)	CB	Sean Morrison	4	0	0	4
5	19	(England)	CF	Rickie Lambert	4	0	0	4
5	24	(England)	LW	Kadeem Harris	4	0	0	4
8	17	(Iceland)	CM	Aron Gunnarsson	3	0	0	3
9	3	(England)	LB	Joe Bennett	2	0	0	2
9	11	(England)	RW	Craig Noone	2	0	0	2
9	14	(Ivory Coast)	CB	Sol Bamba	2	0	0	2
9	33	(Canada)	LW	Junior Hoilett	2	0	0	2
13	16	(England)	CB	Matthew Connolly	1	0	0	1
13	37	(England)	CF	Rhys Healey	1	0	0	1
Own Goals					2	0	0	2
Total					59	1	0	60

==== Disciplinary record ====
As of 7 May 2017

Rank	No.	Nat.	Po.	Name	Championship			FA Cup			League Cup			Total		
Rank	No.	Nat.	Po.	Name	Yellow card	(yellow card) (yellow-red card)	Red card	Yellow card	(yellow card) (yellow-red card)	Red card	Yellow card	(yellow card) (yellow-red card)	Red card	Yellow card	(yellow card) (yellow-red card)	Red card
1	7	(England)	CM	Peter Whittingham	8	0	0	0	0	0	0	0	0	8	0	0
1	17	(Iceland)	CM	Aron Gunnarsson	8	0	0	0	0	0	0	0	0	8	0	0
3	14	(Ivory Coast)	CB	Sol Bamba	6	0	1	0	0	0	0	0	0	6	0	1
3	16	(England)	CB	Matthew Connolly	6	0	1	0	0	0	0	0	0	6	0	1
5	24	(England)	LW	Kadeem Harris	5	0	0	0	0	0	0	0	0	5	0	0
5	2	(England)	RB	Lee Peltier	3	1	0	0	0	0	0	0	0	3	1	0
5	8	(England)	CM	Joe Ralls	4	0	0	0	0	0	0	0	0	4	0	0
5	13	(Republic of Ireland)	LW	Anthony Pilkington	4	0	0	0	0	0	0	0	0	4	0	0
5	33	(Canada)	RW	Junior Hoilett	4	0	0	0	0	0	0	0	0	4	0	0
10	3	(England)	LB	Joe Bennett	3	0	0	0	0	0	0	0	0	3	0	0
10	4	(England)	CB	Sean Morrison	3	0	0	0	0	0	0	0	0	3	0	0
10	15	(England)	RB	Greg Halford	3	0	0	0	0	0	0	0	0	3	0	0
13	6	(Wales)	RB	Jazz Richards	2	0	0	0	0	0	0	0	0	2	0	0
13	11	(England)	RW	Craig Noone	2	0	0	0	0	0	0	0	0	2	0	0
13	19	(England)	CF	Rickie Lambert	2	0	0	0	0	0	0	0	0	2	0	0
16	5	(Gabon)	CB	Bruno Ecuele Manga	0	0	0	0	0	0	1	0	0	1	0	0
16	~~10~~	(Netherlands)	AM	Lex Immers	1	0	0	0	0	0	0	0	0	1	0	0
16	~~15~~	(England)	LW	Kieran Richardson	1	0	0	0	0	0	0	0	0	1	0	0
16	22	(England)	CM	Stuart O'Keefe	1	0	0	0	0	0	0	0	0	1	0	0
16	26	(Denmark)	CF	Kenneth Zohore	1	0	0	0	0	0	0	0	0	1	0	0
16	30	(England)	GK	Ben Wilson	1	0	0	0	0	0	0	0	0	1	0	0
16	37	(England)	CF	Rhys Healey	1	0	0	0	0	0	0	0	0	1	0	0
Total					69	1	2	0	0	0	1	0	0	70	1	2

=== Contracts ===
Date	Position	Nationality	Name	Status	Contract Length	Expiry Date	Ref.
2 August 2016	CM	(England)	Stuart O'Keefe	Signed	3 years	June 2019	
2 September 2016	GK	(England)	Ben Wilson	Extended	2 years	June 2019	
27 September 2016	LW	(Republic of Ireland) (England)	Anthony Pilkington	Extended	2 years	June 2019	
28 April 2017	CF	(Denmark)	Kenneth Zohore	Signed	3 1/2 years	June 2020	
6 June 2017	LW	(Canada)	Junior Hoilett	Signed	1 year	June 2018	
6 June 2017	RB	(England)	Lee Peltier	Extended	2 years	June 2019	
13 June 2017	CM	(England)	Peter Whittingham	Rejected	0 years	June 2017	
16 June 2017	LW	(England)	Kadeem Harris	Signed	2 years	June 2019	
27 June 2017	CB	(Gabon)	Bruno Ecuele Manga	Signed	2 years	June 2019	

== Transfers ==
=== In ===
Date	Position	Nationality	Name	From	Fee	Ref.
1 July 2016	AM	(Netherlands)	Lex Immers	Feyenoord	£2,000,000	
1 July 2016	CF	(Benin) (Belgium)	Frédéric Gounongbe	Westerlo	Free transfer	
6 July 2016	CF	(Denmark)	Kenneth Zohore	KV Kortrijk	Undisclosed	
19 July 2016	RB	(Wales)	Jazz Richards	Fulham	Swap Deal (Note: Malone transferred to Fulham as part of the deal.)	
12 August 2016	DM	(Wales)	Emyr Huws	Wigan Athletic	Undisclosed	
27 August 2016	LB	(England)	Joe Bennett	Aston Villa	Free transfer	
31 August 2016	CF	(England)	Rickie Lambert	West Bromwich Albion	£1,700,000	
2 September 2016	GK	(Republic of Ireland)	Brian Murphy	Portsmouth	Free transfer	
10 October 2016	LW	(Canada)	Junior Hoilett	Free agent	Free transfer	
11 October 2016	CB	(Ivory Coast) (France)	Sol Bamba	Free agent	Free transfer	
11 October 2016	CF	(Morocco) (France)	Marouane Chamakh	Free agent	Free transfer	
12 October 2016	LW	(England)	Kieran Richardson	Free agent	Free transfer	
6 January 2017	RB	(England)	Greg Halford	Rotherham United	Nominal fee	
6 January 2017	ST	(England)	Ibrahim Meite	Harrow Borough	Undisclosed	
8 January 2017	AM	(Wales)	Mark Harris	Academy	Promoted	

- Expenditure ▼ – Undisclosed (£3,700,000+)

=== Loans in ===
Date from	Position	Nationality	Name	From	Date to	Ref.
26 August 2016	GK	(England)	Ben Amos	Bolton Wanderers	End of Season	
18 January 2017	GK	(Scotland)	Allan McGregor	Hull City	End of Season	

=== Out ===
Date	Position	Nationality	Name	To	Fee	Ref.
1 July 2016	RB	(England)	Jazzi Barnum-Bobb	Newport County (Note: Following Barnum-Bobb's release, he signed for Newport County.)	Free transfer	
1 July 2016	CF	(Republic of Ireland)	Eoin Doyle	Preston North End	Undisclosed	
1 July 2016	CF	(Trinidad and Tobago)	Kenwyne Jones	Atlanta United (Note: Following Jones' released, he signed for Atlanta United.)	Free transfer	
1 July 2016	DM	(Slovakia)	Filip Kiss	FK Haugesund	Released	
1 July 2016	GK	(England)	Joe Lewis	Aberdeen (Note: Following Lewis' release, he signed for Aberdeen.)	Free transfer	
1 July 2016	CF	(Wales)	Abdi Noor	Free agent	Released	
1 July 2016	CM	(Wales)	Tyler Roche	Free agent	Released	
1 July 2016	CB	(England)	Ben Turner	Burton Albion (Note: Following Turner's release, he signed for Burton Albion.)	Free transfer	
1 July 2016	CF	(Slovenia)	Etien Velikonja	Olimpija Ljubljana (Note: Following Velikonja's release, he signed for Olimpija Ljubljana.)	Free transfer	
1 July 2016	CB	(Wales)	Curtis Watkins	Free agent	Released	
19 July 2016	LB	(England)	Scott Malone	Fulham	Swap deal (Note: Jazz Richards transferred to Cardiff City as part of the deal.)	
12 August 2016	LB	(Brazil)	Fábio	Middlesbrough	£2,000,000	
19 August 2016	GK	(England)	Simon Moore	Sheffield United	£500,000	
26 August 2016	DM	(South Africa)	Kagisho Dikgacoi	Free agent	Free transfer	
30 August 2016	CF	(Italy)	Federico Macheda	Free agent	Released	
30 August 2016	GK	(Scotland)	David Marshall	Hull City	£2,500,000 (Note: Transfer fee to rise to a potential of £5 million.)	
12 December 2016	CB	(Wales)	Rollin Menayese	Weston-super-Mare	Free transfer	
1 January 2017	LB	(Democratic Republic of the Congo)	David Tutonda	Barnet	Free transfer	
6 January 2017	AM	(Netherlands)	Lex Immers	Club Brugge (Note: Following Immer's release, he signed for Club Brugge)	Released	
9 January 2017	CF	(Morocco) (France)	Marouane Chamakh	Free agent	Released	
12 January 2017	LW	(England)	Kieran Richardson	Free agent	Released	
13 January 2017	CB	(Wales)	Tom James	Yeovil Town	Free transfer	
18 January 2017	CF	(Wales)	Eli Phipps	Colchester United	Undisclosed	
20 January 2017	CM	(Wales)	Tommy O'Sullivan	Colchester United	Undisclosed	
22 January 2017	CB	(Wales)	Ash Baker	Sheffield Wednesday	Free transfer	

- Income ▲ – Undisclosed (£5,000,000+)

=== Loans out ===
Date from	Position	Nationality	Name	At	Date to	Ref.
1 July 2016	CF	(France)	Idriss Saadi	KV Kortrijk	End of Season	
6 July 2016	CB	(England)	Deji Oshilaja	Gillingham	End of Season	
18 August 2016	CM	(England)	Tom Adeyemi	Rotherham United	End of Season	
31 August 2016	CF	(England)	Rhys Healey	Newport County	9 January 2017	
31 August 2016	CF	(England)	Adam Le Fondre	Wigan Athletic	31 January 2017	(Note: On 31 January 2017, Adam Le Fondre's loan at Wigan Athletic was terminated.)
30 September 2016	CF	(Wales)	Eli Phipps	Gloucester City	27 October 2016	
21 October 2016	CF	(Wales)	Jamie Bird	Weston-super-Mare	22 January 2017	
21 October 2016	CM	(Wales)	Lloyd Humphries	Weston-super-Mare	22 January 2017	
30 January 2017	CB	(Nigeria)	Semi Ajayi	Rotherham United	End of Season	
30 January 2017	GK	(England)	Ben Wilson	Rochdale	End of Season	
31 January 2017	CF	(England)	Adam Le Fondre	Bolton Wanderers	End of Season	
31 January 2017	DM	(Wales)	Emyr Huws	Ipswich Town	End of Season	
31 January 2017	RW	(Scotland)	Matthew Kennedy	Plymouth Argyle	End of Season	
31 January 2017	CM	(England)	Stuart O'Keefe	Milton Keynes Dons	1 May 2017	

== Pre-season ==
13 July 2016	Forest Green Rovers	3–1	Cardiff City	Nailsworth, Gloucestershire
19:45 BST	Moore 35' (pen.); Tubbs 70'; Mehew 83'	report	24' Macheda	Stadium: The New Lawn

16 July 2016	Shrewsbury Town	0–4	Cardiff City	Shrewsbury, Shropshire
15:00 BST		report	26' Pilkington; 34' Gounongbe; 70' James; 72' Zohore	Stadium: New Meadow

20 July 2016	Rot Weiss Ahlen	Abandoned	Cardiff City	Ahlen, North Rhine-Westphalia
19:45 WEST

23 July 2016 2016 Osnabrück T	Cardiff City	2–1	FC St. Pauli	Osnabrück, Lower Saxony
15:30 WEST	Immers 1'; Sobiech 27' (o.g.)	report	21' Litka

23 July 2016 2016 Osnabrück T	VfL Osnabrück	0–3	Cardiff City	Osnabrück, Lower Saxony
18:00 WEST			18' Gounongbe; 48' John; 58' Pilkington

26 July 2016	VfL Bochum	1–1	Cardiff City	Herne, North Rhine-Westphalia
18:00 BST	Hoogland 26'	Report	47' (pen.) Whittingham	Stadium: Stadion am Schloss Strünkede

28 July 2016	Exeter City	3–0	Cardiff City	Exeter, Devon
19:30 BST	Holmes 28', 68'; Simpson 52'	Report		Stadium: St James Park; Attendance: 1,166

30 July 2016	AFC Bournemouth	1–0	Cardiff City	Bournemouth, Dorset
15:00 BST	Ibe 11'	Report		Stadium: Dean Court

== Competitions ==
=== EFL Championship ===
==== League table ====
Pos	Team	Pld	W	D	L	GF	GA	GD	Pts
10	Brentford	46	18	10	18	75	65	+10	64
11	Preston North End	46	16	14	16	64	63	+1	62
12	Cardiff City	46	17	11	18	60	61	−1	62
13	Aston Villa	46	16	14	16	47	48	−1	62
14	Barnsley	46	15	13	18	64	67	−3	58

Source: English Football League, Soccerway
Rules for classification: 1) Points; 2) Goal difference; 3) Number of goals scored; 4) Points in head-to-head matches; 5) Goal difference in head-to-head matches; 6) Goals scored in head-to-head matches; 7) Play-off.

==== Results summary ====
Overall								Home						Away					
Pld	W	D	L	GF	GA	GD	Pts	W	D	L	GF	GA	GD	W	D	L	GF	GA	GD
46	17	11	18	60	61	−1	62	11	4	8	31	26	+5	6	7	10	29	35	−6

Last updated: 7 May 2017.
Source: Football League Championship

==== Results by matchday ====
Matchday	1	2	3	4	5	6	7	8	9	10	11	12	13	14	15	16	17	18	19	20	21	22	23	24	25	26	27	28	29	30	31	32	33	34	35	36	37	38	39	40	41	42	43	44	45	46
Ground	A	H	H	A	H	A	A	H	A	H	A	H	H	A	H	A	H	A	H	A	H	H	A	H	A	H	A	A	H	H	A	A	H	H	A	A	H	H	A	A	H	A	H	A	H	A
Result	D	L	W	D	L	L	L	L	W	L	L	W	D	W	L	L	W	L	D	D	W	L	D	W	W	W	L	L	W	L	W	W	W	D	L	D	D	W	L	D	W	L	W	D	L	W
Position	14	17	14	14	17	19	21	24	21	23	23	19	22	20	22	21	21	22	22	22	19	20	19	19	18	16	16	16	15	17	14	12	12	12	12	13	13	13	14	14	14	14	13	12	13	12

Updated to match(es) played on 7 May 2017. Source: Statto.com
A = Away; H = Home; W = Win; D = Draw; L = Loss

==== Matches ====
6 August 2016 1	Birmingham City	0–0	Cardiff City	Birmingham, West Midlands
15:00 BST	Davis (yellow card) 41'	Report		Stadium: St Andrew's; Attendance: 18,833 (1,803); Referee: Tim Robinson (West Sussex)

14 August 2016 2	Cardiff City	0–2	Queens Park Rangers	Cardiff, South Glamorgan
15:00 BST	Ralls (yellow card) 90+4'	BBC Report	Onuoha (yellow card) 9'; Chery (yellow card) 22' (goal) 85' (pen.); Luongo (yellow card) 61'; Caulker 76'; Henry (yellow card) 86'	Stadium: Cardiff City Stadium; Attendance: 15,869; Referee: James Linington (Isle of Wight)

17 August 2016 3	Cardiff City	2–1	Blackburn Rovers	Cardiff, South Glamorgan
19:45 BST	Duffy 14', 20' (o.g.); K Harris (yellow card) 66'	BBC Report; Club Report	Duffy (yellow card) 63' (yellow-red card) 90+5'; Akpan (yellow card) 71'; Graham 77'	Stadium: Cardiff City Stadium; Attendance: 14,041; Referee: Andy Davies (Hampshire)

20 August 2016 4	Fulham	2–2	Cardiff City	Fulham, Greater London
15:00 BST	Sessegnon 44'; Madl (yellow card) 83'; McDonald 86'	BBC Report	60' Ralls; 65' Pilkington; (yellow card) 75' Whittingham; (yellow card) 77' K Harris	Stadium: Craven Cottage; Referee: Jeremy Simpson (Lancashire)

27 August 2016 5	Cardiff City	0–1	Reading	Cardiff, South Glamorgan
15:00 BST		BBC Report	89' Kemorgant	Stadium: Cardiff City Stadium; Attendance: 15,013; Referee: Andy Woolmer (Northamptonshire)

10 September 2016 6	Norwich City	3–2	Cardiff City	Norwich, Norfolk
15:00 BST	Jerome 16'; Klose (yellow card) 50'; Tettey (yellow card) 55'; Martin 59'; Murphy 90'	BBC Report	(yellow card) 45+4' Connolly; 86', 90+4' (yellow card) 90+2' Pilkington	Stadium: Carrow Road; Attendance: 25,519; Referee: Oliver Langford (West Midlands)

13 September 2016 7	Preston North End	3–0	Cardiff City	Preston, Lancashire
19:45 BST	Clarke 36'; Robinson 41' (yellow card) 79'; Hugill 88'	Report	(yellow card) 26' Wilson; (yellow card) 55' Lambert; (yellow card) 62' Noone; (yellow card) 68' Pilkington	Stadium: Deepdale; Attendance: 9,216; Referee: Stephen Martin (Staffordshire)

17 September 2016 8	Cardiff City	0–2	Leeds United	Cardiff, South Glamorgan
12:30 BST		BBC Report	(yellow card) 27' Sacko; (yellow card) 42' Ayling; (yellow card) 54' Dallas; 62' (pen.) Wood; 82' Hernández	Stadium: Cardiff City Stadium; Attendance: 16,608; Referee: Graham Scott (Oxfordshire)
Note: Televised live on Sky

24 September 2016 9	Rotherham United	1–2	Cardiff City	Rotherham, South Yorkshire
15:00 BST	Brown 60'; Halford (yellow card) 81'	Report	(yellow card) 30' O'Keefe; (yellow card) 69' Connolly; 73', 79' Lambert	Stadium: New York Stadium; Attendance: 8,348; Referee: David Coote (Nottinghamshire)

27 September 2016 10	Cardiff City	0–2	Derby County	Cardiff, South Glamorgan
19:45 BST	Whittingham (yellow card) 33'; Connolly (red card) 80'	Report	(yellow card) 52' Butterfield; 55' Ince; 80' (pen.) Blackman; (yellow card) 90+2' Johnson	Stadium: Cardiff City Stadium; Attendance: 14,131; Referee: Geoff Eltringham (Tyne and Wear)

1 October 2016 11	Burton Albion	2–0	Cardiff City	Burton upon Trent, Staffordshire
15:00 BST	Irvine 12', (yellow card) 84'; Akins 49'	BBC Report		Stadium: Pirelli Stadium; Attendance: 4,426; Referee: Andy Madley (Yorkshire)

14 October 2016 12	Cardiff City	2–1	Bristol City	Cardiff, South Glamorgan
19:45 BST	Whittingham 25' (pen.) (yellow card) 42'; Bennett (yellow card) 37'; Bamba 67'; Gunnarsson (yellow card) 70'; Immers (yellow card) 90+4'	Report	69' Tomlin; (yellow card) 70' Abraham; (yellow card) 81' Bryan; (yellow card) 86' Little	Stadium: Cardiff City; Attendance: 22,776; Referee: James Linington (Isle of Wight)
Note: Live on Sky

19 October 2016 13	Cardiff City	1–1	Sheffield Wednesday	Cardiff, South Glamorgan
19:45 BST	Whittingham 9'; Morrison (yellow card) 39'	Report	(yellow card) 45' Lee; 55' Pudil	Stadium: Cardiff City Stadium; Attendance: 15,887; Referee: Darren Bond (Lancashire)

22 October 2016 14	Nottingham Forest	1–2	Cardiff City	Nottingham, Nottinghamshire
17:30 BST	Lam (red card) 58'; Lansbury (yellow card) 76' (goal) 90+1' (pen.)	Report	28' Gunnarsson; 39' Ralls; (yellow card) 86' Richardson	Stadium: City Ground; Attendance: 16,539; Referee: Andy Woolmer (Northamptonshire)
Note: Live on Sky

29 October 2016 15	Cardiff City	0–1	Wigan Athletic	Cardiff, South Glamorgan
15:00 BST		Report	86' Jordi Gómez	Stadium: Cardiff City Stadium; Attendance: 15,969; Referee: Oliver Langford (West Midlands)

5 November 2016 16	Newcastle United	2–1	Cardiff City	Newcastle upon Tyne, Tyne and Wear
15:00 GMT	Atsu 3'; Gouffran 45'	Report	77' Whittingham; (yellow card) 85' Gunnarsson	Stadium: St James' Park; Attendance: 51,257; Referee: Tony Harrington (Cleveland)

19 November 2016 17	Cardiff City	3–2	Huddersfield Town	Cardiff, South Glamorgan
15:00 GMT	Morrison 15'; Hoilett 17'; Lambert 33'; Peltier (yellow card) 48'; Bamba (yellow card) 72'	Report	28' Smith; (yellow card) 49' Hogg; (yellow card) 49' Mooy; 70' Billing; (yellow card) 72' Hefele; (yellow card) 80' Stanković	Stadium: Cardiff City Stadium; Attendance: 15,930; Referee: James Adcock (Nottinghamshire)

26 November 2016 18	Aston Villa	3–1	Cardiff City	Birmingham, West Midlands
15:00 GMT	Adomah 25'; Kodijia 39'; Gestede 90' (pen.)	BBC Report	28' Lambert	Stadium: Villa Park; Attendance: 31,484; Referee: Geoff Eltringham (Tyne and Wear)

3 December 2016 19	Cardiff City	0–0	Brighton & Hove Albion	Cardiff, South Glamorgan
15:00 GMT	Connolly (yellow card) 50'; Whittingham (yellow card) 66'; Gunnarsson (yellow card) 76'	BBC Report	(yellow card) 51' Duffy; (yellow card) 68' (yellow-red card) 90+1' Bong; (yellow card) 83' Dunk	Stadium: Cardiff City Stadium; Attendance: 16,168; Referee: Roger East (Wiltshire)

10 December 2016 20	Ipswich Town	1–1	Cardiff City	Ipswich, Suffolk
15:00 GMT	Lawrence (yellow card) 37'; Varney 58'; Chambers (yellow card) 90+1'	Report	(yellow card) 27' Connolly; 38' (yellow card) 87' Gunnarsson; (red card) 70' Bamba; (yellow card) 90' Pilkington; (yellow card) 90+3' Hoilett	Stadium: Portman Road; Attendance: 15,042; Referee: James Adcock (Nottinghamshire)

13 December 2016 21	Cardiff City	2–1	Wolverhampton Wanderers	Cardiff, South Glamorgan
19:45 GMT	Peltier (yellow card) 16'; Connolly 68'; Whittingham (yellow card) 78'; Pilkington 86'	BBC Report	2' Doherty; (yellow card) 58' Saiss	Stadium: Cardiff City Stadium; Attendance: 14,853; Referee: Andy Madley (Yorkshire)

17 December 2016 22	Cardiff City	3–4	Barnsley	Cardiff, South Glamorgan
15:00 GMT	Morrison 3'; Noone (yellow card) 45'; Whittingham 79'; Pilkington 89'	BBC Report	19', 32', (yellow card) 59' Winnall; (yellow card) 42' Yiadom; 43' Scowen; (yellow card) 53' Davies; (yellow card) 87' MacDonald; 90+5' Williams	Stadium: Cardiff City Stadium; Attendance: 14,754; Referee: Tony Harrington (Cleveland)

26 December 2016 23	Brentford	2–2	Cardiff City	Brentford, London
13:00 GMT	Bjelland (yellow card) 23'; Hogan (yellow card) 73'; Dean (yellow card) 75'; Kaikai 83', 90+1'	Scoresway Report; BBC Report	Whittingham 24' (pen.) (yellow card) 31'; Gunnarsson (yellow card) 73'; Zohore 89'	Stadium: Griffin Park; Attendance: 11,098; Referee: Simon Hooper (Wiltshire)

30 December 2016	Brighton & Hove Albion	Postponed (Fog)	Cardiff City	Brighton, East Sussex
19:45 GMT				Stadium: Falmer Stadium
Note: Postponed because of heavy fog

2 January 2017 24	Cardiff City	1–0	Aston Villa	Cardiff, South Glamorgan
15:00 GMT	Ralls 16' (yellow card) 27'; Gunnarsson (yellow card) 57'; Bamba (yellow card) 64'; Peltier (yellow card) 72'	BBC Report	(yellow card) 42' Chester; (yellow card) 60' Grealish; (yellow card) 78' Bacuna; (yellow card) 85' Hutton	Stadium: Cardiff City Stadium; Attendance: 21,391; Referee: Andy Davies (Hampshire)

14 January 2017 25	Bristol City	2–3	Cardiff City	Ashton Gate, Bristol
12:00 GMT	Murphy 51' (o.g.); Abraham 78'; Little (yellow card) 90'	BBC Report	(yellow card) 35' Bamba; (yellow card) 62' Whittingham; 74' (pen.), 85' Pilkington; 82' Harris	Stadium: Ashton Gate Stadium; Attendance: 19,452; Referee: Craig Pawson (Sheffield & Hallamshire County Football Association)

21 January 2017 26	Cardiff City	1–0	Burton Albion	Cardiff, South Glamorgan
15:00 GMT	Healey 90+1'	BBC Report		Stadium: Cardiff City Stadium; Attendance: 15,543; Referee: Tim Robinson (West Sussex)

24 January 2017 27	Brighton & Hove Albion	1–0	Cardiff City	Brighton, East Sussex
19:45 GMT	Hemed 73'; Knockaert (yellow card) 90'	BBC Report	(yellow card) 21' Junior Hoilett	Stadium: Falmer Stadium; Attendance: 26,688; Referee: Chris Kavanagh (Manchester)

28 January 2017 28	Reading	2–1	Cardiff City	Reading, Berkshire
15:00 GMT	Swift 42'; Moore (yellow card) 45'; Kermorgant 60'	BBC Report	(yellow card) 8' Bamba; 45+1' (pen.) Ralls	Stadium: Madjeski Stadium; Attendance: 18,558; Referee: James Adcock (Nottinghamshire)

31 January 2017 29	Cardiff City	2–0	Preston North End	Cardiff, South Glamorgan
19:45 GMT	Whittingham 18' (pen.); Zohore 28'; Harris (yellow card) 64'	BBC Report	(yellow card) 72' McGeady	Stadium: Cardiff City Stadium; Attendance: 13,894; Referee: Graham Scott (Oxfordshire)

4 February 2017 30	Cardiff City	0–1	Norwich City	Cardiff, South Glamorgan
15:00 GMT	Connolly (yellow card) 74'; Healey (yellow card) 76'	BBC Report	40', (yellow card) 49' Jerome; (yellow card) 70' Tettey; (yellow card) 77' Howson	Stadium: Cardiff City Stadium; Attendance: 15,901; Referee: Chris Kavanagh (Manchester)

11 February 2017 31	Leeds United	0–2	Cardiff City	Leeds, West Yorkshire
15:00 GMT	Ayling (yellow card) 31'; Bridcutt (yellow card) 43' (yellow-red card) 86'; Cooper (yellow card) 88'	BBC Report	53' Morrison; (yellow card) 64' Halford; 71' Zohore	Stadium: Elland Road; Attendance: 31,516; Referee: James Linington (Isle of Wight)

14 February 2017 32	Derby County	3–4	Cardiff City	Derby, Derbyshire
19:45 GMT	de Sart 7'; Bent 17', 74'	BBC Report	41', 47' K Harris; 57' Noone; 90' (pen.) Ralls	Stadium: Pride Park Stadium; Attendance: 26,541; Referee: Steve Martin (Staffordshire)

18 February 2017 33	Cardiff City	5–0	Rotherham United	Cardiff, South Glamorgan
15:00 GMT	K Harris 11'; Hoilett 45+3'; Noone 49'; Zohore 54', 83'	BBC Report	(yellow card) 63' Forde; (yellow card) 81' Belaid	Stadium: Cardiff City Stadium; Attendance: 15,560; Referee: Jeremy Simpson (Lancashire)

25 February 2017 34	Cardiff City	2–2	Fulham	Cardiff, South Glamorgan
15:00 GMT	Zohore 24', 56', (yellow card) 57'; Gunnarsson (yellow card) 41'	BBC Report	16' Johansen; (yellow card) 21' Piazon; 68' Kebano	Stadium: Cardiff City Stadium; Attendance: 15,656; Referee: Scott Duncan (Northumberland)

4 March 2017 35	Queens Park Rangers	2–1	Cardiff City	Shepherd's Bush, London
15:00 GMT	Luongo (yellow card) 40'; N'Gbakoto 62'; Richards 83' (o.g.); Perch (yellow card) 88'	BBC Report	45' Bamba; (yellow card) 66' Morrison	Stadium: Loftus Road; Attendance: 15,103; Referee: Darren England (Barnsley)

7 March 2017 36	Blackburn Rovers	1–1	Cardiff City	Blackburn, Lancashire
19:45 GMT	Williams 90'	Report	38' Zohore; (yellow card) 45+1' K Harris; (yellow card) 90+3' Bennett	Stadium: Ewood Park; Attendance: 10,645; Referee: David Coote (Nottinghamshire)

11 March 2017 37	Cardiff City	1–1	Birmingham City	Cardiff, South Glamorgan
15:00 GMT	Ralls 53' (pen.), (yellow card) 88'	Report	(yellow card) 45' Bielik; (yellow card) 46' Davis; (yellow card) 52' Shotton; 89' Jutkiewicz; (yellow card) 90+5' Gardner	Stadium: Cardiff City Stadium; Attendance: 20,334; Referee: Peter Bankes (Merseyside)

18 March 2017 38	Cardiff City	3–1	Ipswich Town	Cardiff, South Glamorgan
15:00 GMT	Zohore 36', 50'; Bennett 63'	Report	Chambers 23'; Berra (yellow card) 53'; Pitman (yellow card) 68'	Stadium: Cardiff City Stadium; Attendance: 15,182; Referee: James Linington (Isle of Wight)

1 April 2017 39	Wolverhampton Wanderers	3–1	Cardiff City	Wolverhampton, West Midlands
15:00 BST	Batth 9', 41'; Marshall (yellow card) 70'; Costa 82'	Report	Zohore 12'; Bamba (yellow card) 35'; Ralls (yellow card) 52'; Harris (yellow card) 62'	Stadium: Molineux Stadium; Attendance: 20,519; Referee: Andy Davies (Hampshire)

4 April 2017 40	Barnsley	0–0	Cardiff City	Barnsley, South Yorkshire
19:45 BST	Janko (yellow card) 76'	Report	Bamba (yellow card) 48'; Connolly (yellow card) 82'; Halford (yellow card) 90+1'	Stadium: Oakwell; Attendance: 10,814; Referee: Scott Duncan (Northumberland)

8 April 2017 41	Cardiff City	2–1	Brentford	Cardiff, South Glamorgan
15:00 BST	Whittingham (yellow card) 39', (goal) 76'; Morrison 47'; Hoilett (yellow card) 88'	BBC Report	42' Canós	Stadium: Cardiff City Stadium; Attendance: 15,816; Referee: Darren Bond (Lancashire)

15 April 2017 42	Sheffield Wednesday	1–0	Cardiff City	Sheffield, South Yorkshire
15:00 BST	Forestieri 84'	Report	Hoilett (yellow card) 42'	Stadium: Hillsborough Stadium; Attendance: 28,007; Referee: David Coote (Nottinghamshire)

17 April 2017 43	Cardiff City	1–0	Nottingham Forest	Cardiff, South Glamorgan
15:00 BST	Gunnarsson 70'	BBC Report		Stadium: Cardiff City Stadium; Attendance: 16,413; Referee: Andy Madley (Yorkshire)

22 April 2017 44	Wigan Athletic	0–0	Cardiff City	Wigan, Greater Manchester
15:00 BST		BBC Report	(yellow card) 87' Halford	Stadium: DW Stadium; Attendance: 10,875; Referee: Oliver Langford (West Midlands)

28 April 2017 45	Cardiff City	0–2	Newcastle United	Cardiff, South Glamorgan
19:45 BST	Richards (yellow card) 79'	Report	55' Atsu; 65' Hayden	Stadium: Cardiff City Stadium; Attendance: 23,153; Referee: Graham Scott (Oxfordshire)
Note: Televised live on Sky

7 May 2017 46	Huddersfield Town	0–3	Cardiff City	Huddersfield, West Yorkshire
12:00 BST	Ward (red card) 20'	BBC Report	7' Zohore; 29', 71' Bennett; (yellow card) 75' Richards	Stadium: John Smith's Stadium; Attendance: 20,583; Referee: Jeremy Simpson (Lancashire)

=== FA Cup ===
8 January 2017 Third round	Cardiff City	1–2	Fulham	Cardiff
11:30 GMT	Pilkington 8'	Scoreway; BBC Report	14' Johansen; 33' Sessegnon	Stadium: Cardiff City Stadium; Attendance: 5,199; Referee: Andy Woolmer (Northamptonshire)
Note: Live on BBC Wales

=== EFL Cup ===
11 August 2016 Round 1	Bristol Rovers	1–0	Cardiff City	Horfield, Bristol
19:45 BST	Lockyer (yellow card) 90+1'; Lines 115'	Report	(yellow card) 100' Ecuele Manga	Stadium: Memorial Stadium; Attendance: 4,851; Referee: Chris Kavanagh (Manchester)
Note: Live on Sky Sports

== Summary ==
Games played	48 (46 Championship, 1 FA Cup, 1 League Cup)
Games won	17 (17 Championship, 0 FA Cup, 0 League Cup)
Games drawn	11 (11 Championship, 0 FA Cup, 0 League Cup)
Games lost	20 (18 Championship, 1 FA Cup, 1 League Cup)
Goals scored	61 (60 Championship, 1 FA Cup, 0 League Cup)
Goals conceded	63 (60 Championship, 2 FA Cup, 1 League Cup)
Goal difference	−2
Clean sheets	9 (9 Championship, 0 FA Cup, 0 League Cup)
Yellow cards	70 (69 Championship, 0 FA Cup, 1 League Cup)
Red cards	3 (3 Championship, 0 FA Cup, 0 League Cup)
Worst Discipline	Gunnarsson & Whittingham (8 (yellow card) , 0 (yellow card) (yellow-red card) , 0 (red card) )
Best result	5–0 vs Rotherham United (18 Feb 17)
Worst result	0–3 vs Preston North End (14 Sep 16)
Most appearances	Morrison (43 starts, 1 subs)
Top scorer	Zohore (12)
Points	62

== Club staff ==
=== Backroom staff ===
Position	Name
Manager	(England) Neil Warnock
Assistant manager	(England) Kevin Blackwell
First-team coach	(Wales) James Rowberry
First-team coach	(England) Ronnie Jepson
Goalkeeper coach	(Wales) Andy Dibble
Head of Fitness & Conditioning	(England) Lee Southernwood
Head of Medical	(Wales) Hywel Griffiths MCSP HCPC
First-team physiotherapist	(England) Edward Richmond
Senior Strength & Conditioning	(Wales) Mike Beere
Sports scientist	(Wales) Ben Parry
Club doctor	(Wales) Dr. Len Nokes
Performance & Recruitment Analyst	(England) Graham Younger
Opposition Analyst	(England) Martin Hodge
Kit & equipment manager	(England) Ian Lenning

=== Board of directors ===
Position	Name
Chairman	(Cyprus) Mehmet Dalman
General Manager	(Malaysia) Ken Choo
Finance Director	(Wales) Richard Thompson
Non-Executive; Board Members; Football Club	(Wales) Steve Borley (since 2003) (Malaysia) Derek Chee Seng Chin (since 2010) (Malaysia) Veh Ken Choo (since 2016) (Cyprus) Mehmet Dalman (since 2012) (Malaysia) Meng Kwong Lim (since 2010)
Non-Executive; Board Members; Cardiff City (Holdings)	(Malaysia) Danni Rais (since 2012)
Club Secretary	(England) David Beeby
