= 2016 Osnabrück Football Summer =

Tournament details
- Host country: Germany
- Dates: 23 July
- Teams: 4 (from 1 confederation)
- Venue(s): 1 (in 1 host city)

Final positions
- Champions: (Wales) Cardiff City (1st title)
- Runners-up: (Germany) Borussia Mönchengladbach
- Third place: (Germany) FC St. Pauli
- Fourth place: (Germany) VfL Osnabrück

Tournament statistics
- Matches played: 4
- Goals scored: 9 (2.25 per match)
- Top scorer(s): (Belgium) Thorgan Hazard (2 goals)

The 2016 Osnabrück Football Summer was a summer football friendly tournament organized by VfL Osnabrück and Match IQ. All matches were played at hosts Osnabrück's Osnatel-Arena, they were joined by Borussia Mönchengladbach (Germany), Cardiff City (England) and FC St. Pauli (Germany).

== Overview ==
All matches lasted 60 minutes. Games that ended in a draw after 60 minutes were decided by a penalty shoot-out.

=== Participants ===
| Nation | Team | Location | Confederation | League |
|---|---|---|---|---|
| Germany | Borussia Mönchengladbach | Mönchengladbach | UEFA | Bundesliga |
| Wales | Cardiff City | Cardiff | UEFA | Football League Championship |
| Germany | VfL Osnabrück | Osnabrück | UEFA | 3. Liga |
| Germany | FC St. Pauli | Hamburg | UEFA | 2. Bundesliga |

=== Standings ===
The tournament included four sixty-minute matches, with a penalty shoot-out deciding any games that ended level.

| Pos | Team | Pld | W | L | GF | GA | GD | Pts | Final result |
|---|---|---|---|---|---|---|---|---|---|
| 1 | (Wales) Cardiff City | 2 | 2 | 0 | 5 | 1 | +4 | 6 | 2016 Osnabrück Football Summer Champions |
| 2 | (Germany) Borussia Mönchengladbach | 2 | 2 | 0 | 2 | 1 | +1 | 6 | |
| 3 | (Germany) FC St. Pauli | 2 | 0 | 2 | 1 | 2 | −1 | 0 | |
| 4 | (Germany) VfL Osnabrück (H) | 2 | 0 | 2 | 1 | 5 | −4 | 0 | |

Source: VfL Osnabrück
Rules for classification: 1) Points; 2) Goal difference; 3) Head to head result
(H) Hosts

=== Matches ===
23 July 2016
15:30 CEST

| VfL Osnabrück (Germany) | 0–3 | (Wales) Cardiff City |
|---|---|---|
| | Report | Gounongbe 18'; John 48'; Pilkington 55' |

Osnatel-Arena, Osnabrück

23 July 2016
16:45 CEST

| Cardiff City (Wales) | 2–1 | (Germany) FC St. Pauli |
|---|---|---|
| Immers 2'; Sobiech 28' (o.g.) | Report | Litka 20' |

Osnatel-Arena, Osnabrück

23 July 2016
18:00 CEST

| FC St. Pauli (Germany) | 0–0 | (Germany) Borussia Mönchengladbach |
|---|---|---|
| | Report |
Penalties
| Bouhaddouz (penalty scored); Picault (penalty scored); Ziereis (penalty scored); Gonther (penalty scored); Buchtmann (penalty missed) | 4–5 | (penalty scored) Stindl; (penalty scored) Hofmann; (penalty scored) Hahn; (penalty scored) Strobl; (penalty scored) Korb |

Osnatel-Arena, Osnabrück

23 July 2016
19:15 CEST

| Borussia Mönchengladbach (Germany) | 2–1 | (Germany) VfL Osnabrück |
|---|---|---|
| Hazard 33', 50' | Report | Reimerink 38' |

Osnatel-Arena, Osnabrück

=== Goalscorers ===
| Rank | Name | Team | Goals |
|---|---|---|---|
| 1 | (Belgium) Thorgan Hazard | (Germany) Borussia Mönchengladbach | 2 |
| 2 | (Republic of Ireland) Anthony Pilkington | (Wales) Cardiff City | 1 |
| 2 | (Wales) Declan John | (Wales) Cardiff City | 1 |
| 2 | (Benin) Frédéric Gounongbe | (Wales) Cardiff City | 1 |
| 2 | (Netherlands) Jules Reimerink | (Germany) VfL Osnabrück | 1 |
| 2 | (Netherlands) Lex Immers | (Wales) Cardiff City | 1 |
| 2 | (Netherlands) Maurice Litka | (Germany) FC St. Pauli | 1 |
| O.G. | (Germany) Lasse Sobiech | (Germany) FC St. Pauli | 1 |

== Media coverage ==
| Market | Countries | Broadcast partner | Ref |
|---|---|---|---|
| International | 195 | Bet365 (N/A); Cardiff City Player (English) (Cardiff City games only); LAOLA1.TV (N/A) | |
| Total countries | 195 | | |
