= Rick Hoogendorp =

Dutch footballer (born 1975)

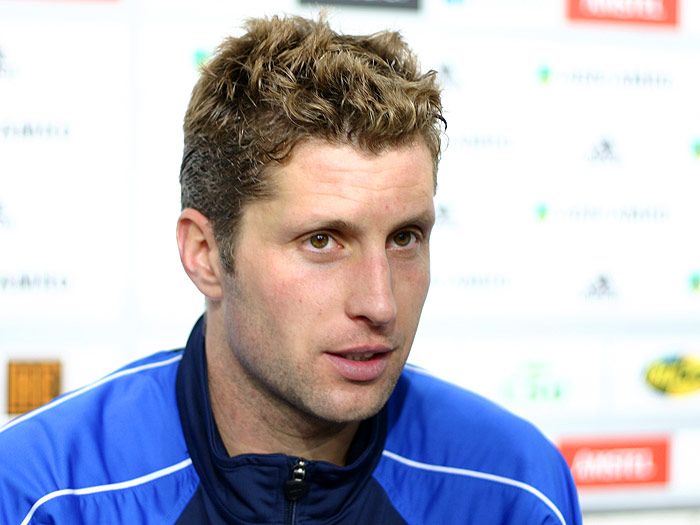

Personal information
- Full name: Rick Hoogendorp
- Date of birth: 12 January 1975 (age 51)
- Place of birth: Blerick, Netherlands
- Height: 1.81 m (5 ft 11 in)
- Position: Forward

Team information
- Current team: DSO (head coach)

Youth career
- 1980-1987: Laakkwartier
- 1997-1991: VCS
- 1991-1994: FC Den Haag

Senior career*
Years	Team	Apps	(Gls)
1994–1995	ADO Den Haag	33	(15)
1995–1996	MVV	42	(8)
1997–1998	Dordrecht	65	(32)
1998–2005	RKC	218	(95)
2000	→ Celta Vigo (loan)	7	(0)
2006–2009	VfL Wolfsburg	23	(1)
2007–2009	→ ADO Den Haag (loan)	51	(12)
2009–2010	Scheveningen		
Total		439	(163)

Managerial career
- 2011–2014: ADO Den Haag (academy)
- 2014–2015: ADO Den Haag (U18)
- 2015–2018: ADO Den Haag (U15)
- 2017–2020: Jong ADO Den Haag (assistant)
- 2018–2020: ADO Den Haag (U17)
- 2020: ADO Den Haag (assistant)
- 2020–2022: Jong ADO Den Haag (assistant)
- 2022–2025: FC Dordrecht (assistant)
- * Club domestic league appearances and goals

Rick Hoogendorp (born 12 January 1975) is a Dutch retired football striker.

== Career ==
Hoogendorp was born in Blerick, Limburg when his father Dick played for FC VVV but raised in The Hague. He played for MVV (1995–1997), FC Dordrecht (1997–1999), RKC (1999–2006), VfL Wolfsburg (2006), and ADO Den Haag (2007–2009) in the Dutch highest league, Eredivisie. He also had a short loan spell at Celta de Vigo in Spain.

He is RKC's all-time top goalscorer with 95 goals.

== Managerial career ==
In the summer 2009, Hoogendorp was hired as a relationship manager for ADO Den Haag. He began his coaching career at the end of August 2011, also at ADO, where he was going to function as a forward coach for the club's academy teams. From the summer 2014, he took charge of ADO's U-18 squad.

From 2015 to 2017, he was in charge of the U15's. Beside that, Hoogendorp also functioned as assistant coach for Jong ADO Den Haag from June 2017. From the summer 2018, he was promoted to U17 manager along with his position on the Jong team.

In May 2020 it was confirmed, that Hoogendorp from the 2020–21 season would continue as a first team assistant coach under head coach Aleksandar Ranković. However, Hoogendorp was removed from this position on 4 November 2020 and returned to work with the club's academy. He was appointed in a role as forward coach for the academy teams and assistant coach for Jong ADO Den Haag.

Hoogendorp was named head coach at amateur side DSO in January 2026, after he had announced to leave SV Wippolder at the end of the season a month earlier. He had been caretaker at VELO before joining the Delfgauw club.
