= Ingmar Maayen =

Dutch footballer

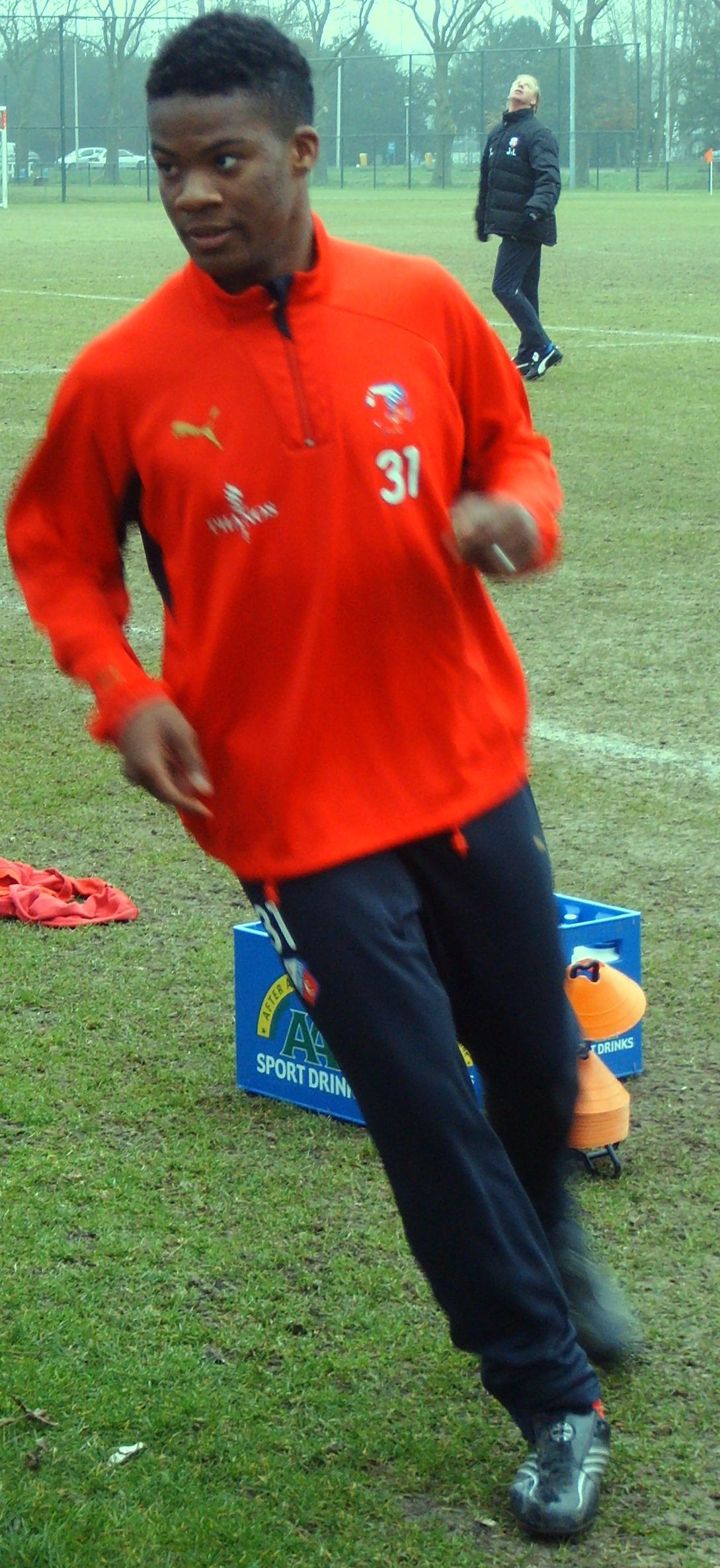

Personal information
- Date of birth: 29 January 1988 (age 38)
- Place of birth: Leiden, Netherlands
- Height: 1.73 m (5 ft 8 in)
- Position: Winger

Youth career
- SV DSO
- Feyenoord
- Utrecht

Senior career*
Years	Team	Apps	(Gls)
2007–2010	Utrecht	1	(0)
2010–2012	AGOVV	16	(0)
2012	Dordrecht	0	(0)
2013	Etar Veliko Tarnovo		
2013–2014	Telstar	21	(2)
2014–2016	Scheveningen	44	(6)
2016–2017	RVVH		
2017–2018	XerxesDZB		
2018–2020	Smitshoek		
- * Club domestic league appearances and goals as of 15 November 2024

Ingmar Maayen (born 29 January 1988) is a Dutch professional footballer who plays as a winger. He has Curaçaoan descent.
