= Kenneth Zohore =

Danish professional footballer (born 1994)

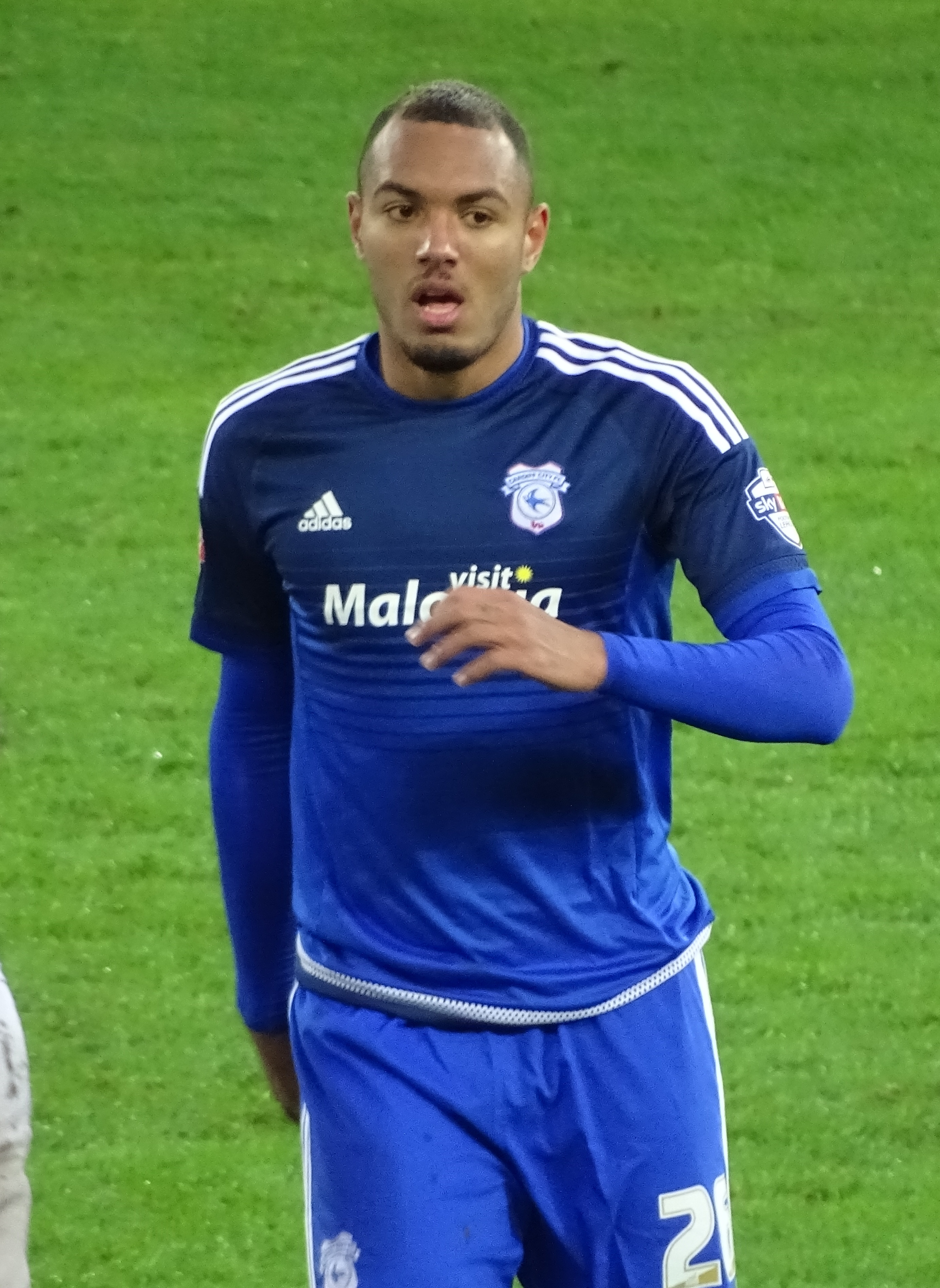
- Zohore playing for Cardiff City in 2016

Personal information
- Full name: Albin Kenneth Dahrup Zohore
- Date of birth: 31 January 1994 (age 32)
- Place of birth: Copenhagen, Denmark
- Height: 1.89 m (6 ft 2 in)
- Position: Striker

Team information
- Current team: Fremad Amager
- Number: 11

Youth career
- 2002–2006: BK Skjold
- 2006–2009: KB

Senior career*
Years	Team	Apps	(Gls)
2010–2012	Copenhagen	16	(1)
2012–2015	Fiorentina	0	(0)
2013–2014	→ Brøndby (loan)	25	(5)
2014	→ IFK Göteborg (loan)	5	(2)
2015–2016	OB	27	(9)
2016	KV Kortrijk	0	(0)
2016	→ Cardiff City (loan)	12	(2)
2016–2019	Cardiff City	84	(22)
2019–2023	West Bromwich Albion	18	(3)
2020–2021	→ Millwall (loan)	17	(2)
2023	OB	4	(0)
2023–2024	Śląsk Wrocław	6	(0)
2023	Śląsk Wrocław II	1	(0)
2025–	Fremad Amager	36	(5)

International career
2009–2011	Denmark U17	24	(13)
2012	Denmark U18	2	(0)
2010–2013	Denmark U19	16	(6)
2013–2017	Denmark U21	20	(8)
- * Club domestic league appearances and goals as of 3 October 2026

Albin Kenneth Dahrup Zohore (French pronunciation: [kɛ.nɛt zo.ɔ.ʁe]; Danish pronunciation: [ˈkʰɛnˀet soˈhoːɐ̯]); born 31 January 1994) is a Danish professional footballer who plays as a striker for Danish 2nd Division side Fremad Amager.

He began his career in his native Denmark, making his professional debut for Copenhagen at the age of 16, becoming the youngest player to play in the Danish Superliga. Regarded as a promising youngster, he joined Italian side Fiorentina in 2012 but struggled to break into the first-team and, following loan spells with Brøndby IF and IFK Göteborg, he returned to Denmark on a permanent basis by joining OB in 2015.

== Personal life ==
Zohore was born in Copenhagen to a Danish mother and an Ivorian father. His father is the second cousin of former Chelsea striker Didier Drogba.

== Career ==
=== Copenhagen ===
After spells with BK Skjold and KB, Zohore joined the youth system at Copenhagen, being promoted to the under-19 squad at the age of 15 in 2009. He joined the first-team's training camp in Marbella, Spain, on 2 February 2010 together with Thobias Skovgaard. He made his professional debut for the club on 7 March 2010, at the age of 16 years and 35 days old, becoming the youngest player to ever make his debut in the Danish Superliga after replacing César Santin in the 73rd minute during a 5–0 victory against AGF. However, the match was his only appearance for the first-team during the 2009–10 season.

On 20 October 2010, Zohore made his first UEFA Champions League appearance for Copenhagen, playing against FC Barcelona at Camp Nou. The 16-year-old striker replaced César Santin in the 74th minute of the game, becoming one of the youngest players ever to play in the Champion's League. Ten days later, he scored his first senior goal for FC Copenhagen in the Danish Superliga against Lyngby Boldklub. He is the second youngest goalscorer ever in the Danish Superliga, after Mads Beierholm.

Zohore attracted attention from numerous clubs around Europe, spending time on trial at Chelsea, also being approached by Chelsea player Didier Drogba after the two sides met in a Champions League fixture, and Inter Milan. His performances saw him described as "one of the top striking prospects anywhere in the world".

=== Fiorentina & loan spells ===
On 31 January 2012, FC Copenhagen announced that Zohore had signed for Italian side ACF Fiorentina on his 18th birthday for a fee in the region of £1 million. He was given shirt no. 33. However, Zohore did not feature for the first team, later stating that he was "too young" to cope with the strong competition for places.

On 8 August 2013, Brøndby IF, managed by Zohore's former coach at Danish youth levels Thomas Frank, announced that they had agreed a deal with ACF Fiorentina to sign Zohore on a season-long loan with the option to buy at the end of the year for between €2.2 and €2.3 million. Brøndby paid a loan fee of nearly €100,000 to secure the move, beating off competition from German side Hannover 96. The transfer nearly collapsed as Brøndby were unaware of their need to pay Zohore's wages during the loan spell, but the loan was eventually completed. Brøndby were hopeful of completing the transfer on a permanent basis but were unable to meet Fiorentina's valuation.

On 11 August 2014 IFK Göteborg announced that Zohore had joined the club on a loan deal from Fiorentina. He made his debut 13 August 2014 in an away game against Åtvidaberg BK coming on as a substitute. In his home game debut against Brommapojkarna on 17 August 2014, Zohore scored his first goal for IFK Göteborg three minutes after coming on as a substitute in the 83rd minute.

=== Odense Boldklub ===
On 3 February 2015, Zohore returned to the Danish Superliga with Odense Boldklub, following the termination of his contract with Fiorentina.

=== Cardiff City ===
==== 2015–16 ====
On the final day of the winter transfer window in January 2016, Zohore joined Championship side Cardiff City on loan from Belgian side K.V. Kortrijk, a club also owned by Cardiff chairman Vincent Tan, who signed him that same day from OB for a fee reported to be around £1 million. At the time, Cardiff were under a transfer ban following a breach of financial fair play rules and were banned from signing players on permanent contracts, although club sources stated that the deal was not made to circumvent the transfer ban and that he was moving to Cardiff to "boost his experience". He made his debut on 6 February in a goalless draw against Milton Keynes Dons, coming on as a substitute in place of Sammy Ameobi. He featured frequently in the final months of the 2015–16 season as a substitute, scoring his first goal for the club on 19 April 2016 during a 2–1 defeat against Brentford. He was rewarded with his first start for the club in the following match, a 2–1 victory over Bolton Wanderers, during which he scored Cardiff's opening goal. He finished his loan spell having made 12 appearances, scoring twice.

==== 2016–17 ====
Zohore went on to sign a three-year deal in the Welsh capital in June 2016 for an undisclosed fee. However, new manager Paul Trollope, who had replaced Russell Slade following the end of the previous season, favoured fellow new signings Frederic Gounongbe and Rickie Lambert following his appointment with Zohore making only one start in the opening four months of the season, during a 1–0 defeat to Bristol Rovers in the first round of the League Cup on 11 August 2016. With the club struggling, Trollope was replaced by Neil Warnock and, in December 2016, Zohore impressed as a half time substitute during a 2–1 victory against Wolverhampton Wanderers. Following the match, Warnock praised Zohore's performances in his first two appearances under him, commenting that Zohore had been "a little lazy" during his time at Cardiff and that a transfer away from the club had been considered, but that his improvement meant that he could not "buy anybody better than him at the minute". He went onto score his first goal on Boxing Day during a 2–2 draw with Brentford. Zohore was nominated for Championship Player of the Month in February, following a goal against Leeds United and braces against Rotherham United and Fulham, but missed out to Leeds' Chris Wood. His 12 goals for Cardiff saw him as the top goalscorer for the season, and he was awarded a contract keeping him at the club until 2020. At the end of the season, he was awarded the club's Young Player of the Year award.

==== 2017–18 ====
Zohore's form at the end of the previous season attracted interest from several clubs with Hull City, with an original bid of £6 million, and Brighton & Hove Albion both having bids rejected by Cardiff. Manager Neil Warnock later commented that Zohore was not for sale and would only leave the club if "I have a heart attack and another manager takes over." Zohore scored his first goal of the season in the opening match, the only goal of the game in a 1–0 victory over Burton Albion on 5 August 2017. Following a nine-game goal drought, Zohore scored a brace against Leeds United on 26 September, in a 3–1 win, before suffering an ankle injury which kept him out until the Christmas Period. He returned to the side, replacing Omar Bogle in a 2–0 defeat at Bolton Wanderers on 23 December, before scoring his fourth of the season against Fulham on Boxing Day. The new year saw Zohore score 5 goals, including winners against Bristol City and Ipswich Town. Cardiff finished in 2nd place, gaining promotion to the Premier League.

==== 2018–19 ====
Zohore started the 2018–19 season as Cardiff's lead striker against Bournemouth, however, a string of injuries and bad form saw Zohore in and out of the squad. He scored his first Premier League goal, in a 2–1 win at Southampton on 9 February.

=== West Bromwich Albion ===
On 19 July 2019, Zohore signed for Championship side West Bromwich Albion in a deal worth up to £8m. He scored his first goal for West Brom, a penalty, in a 1–1 draw with Reading on 21 August 2019. But he only played a total of 19 games in four seasons at the club. On 31 January 2023, Kenneth Zohore had his contract terminated with West Brom by way of mutual consent.

=== Loan to Millwall ===
On 16 October 2020, Zohore joined Millwall on a short-term loan until 16 January 2021. He scored his first goal for Millwall in a 2–0 win against Preston North End on 28 October.

=== Return to OB ===
On transfer deadline day, 31 January 2023, Zohore returned to his former club, OB, on a deal for the rest of the season. With just over 100 minutes of playing time in 6 months, Zohore left OB at the end of his contract.

=== Śląsk Wrocław ===
On 11 July 2023, Zohore joined Polish Ekstraklasa side Śląsk Wrocław on a free transfer, signing a one-year deal with an option for another season. He left the club by mutual consent on 6 March 2024.

=== Fremad Amager ===
On 30 January 2025, it was confirmed that Zohore returned home to Denmark as he had signed with Danish 2nd Division side Fremad Amager.

== International career ==
In May 2018 he was named in Denmark's preliminary 35-man squad for the 2018 World Cup in Russia. However, he did not make the final 23.

== Career statistics ==
As of 4 January 2024

Club	Season	League			National Cup		League Cup		Continental		Total	
Club	Season	Division	Apps	Goals	Apps	Goals	Apps	Goals	Apps	Goals	Apps	Goals
Copenhagen	2009–10	Danish Superliga	1	0	0	0	0	0	—		1	0
Copenhagen	2010–11	Danish Superliga	15	1	1	0	—		5 (Note: Appearances in UEFA Champions League)	0	21	1
Copenhagen	2011–12	Danish Superliga	0	0	1	0	—		—		1	0
Copenhagen	Total		16	1	2	0	0	0	5	0	23	1
Fiorentina	2011–12	Serie A	0	0	0	0	—		—		0	0
Fiorentina	2012–13	Serie A	0	0	0	0	—		—		0	0
Fiorentina	Total		0	0	0	0	0	0	0	0	0	0
Brøndby IF	2013–14	Danish Superliga	25	5	1	0	—		—		26	5
IFK Göteborg	2014	Allsvenskan	5	2	0	0	—		—		5	2
Odense	2014–15	Danish Superliga	11	2	0	0	—		—		11	2
Odense	2015–16	Danish Superliga	16	7	0	0	—		—		16	7
Odense	Total		27	9	0	0	0	0	0	0	27	9
Cardiff City (loan)	2015–16	Championship	12	2	0	0	0	0	—		12	2
Cardiff City	2016–17	Championship	29	12	0	0	1	0	—		30	12
Cardiff City	2017–18	Championship	36	9	3	0	0	0	—		39	9
Cardiff City	2018–19	Premier League	19	1	0	0	1	0	—		20	1
Cardiff City	Total		84	22	3	0	2	0	0	0	89	22
West Bromwich Albion	2019–20	Championship	17	3	3	2	0	0	—		20	5
West Bromwich Albion	2020–21	Premier League	0	0	0	0	0	0	—		0	0
West Bromwich Albion	2021–22	Championship	2	0	0	0	1	0	—		3	0
West Bromwich Albion	2022–23	Championship	0	0	0	0	0	0	—		0	0
West Bromwich Albion	Total		19	3	3	2	1	0	0	0	23	5
Millwall (loan)	2020–21	Championship	17	2	2	1	0	0	—		19	3
Odense (loan)	2022–23	Danish Superliga	4	0	—		—		—		4	0
Śląsk Wrocław	2023–24	Ekstraklasa	6	0	1	0	—		—		7	0
Śląsk Wrocław II	2023–24	III liga	1	0	0	0	—		—		1	0
Career total			216	46	12	3	3	0	5	0	236	49

== Honours ==
Copenhagen

- Danish Superliga: 2009–10, 2010–11

Cardiff City

- EFL Championship runner-up: 2017–18
