= SV DSO =

- Full name: Sportvereniging Door Samenspel Overwinnen
- Nickname: DSO Zoetermeer
- Founded: 30 July 1928; 98 years ago
- Ground: Sportcomplex Bentwoud, Benthuizen
- League: Vierde Divisie (2023/24)
Home colours

SV DSO (Door Samenspel Overwinnen) is a Dutch amateur football club from Zoetermeer and Benthuizen, founded on 30 July 1928. The club's first team relegated from Vierde Divisie after the 2023-24 season and is playing in the Eerste Klasse in West 2 Group B (season 2024/25).

== Notable players ==
- Hennos Asmelash
- Dick van Burik
- Edwin de Graaf
- Lex Immers
- Christian Kum
- Ingmar Maayen
- Leroy Resodihardjo
- Roel Stoffels
- Anton Vriesde
