= Lex Immers =

Dutch footballer (born 1986)

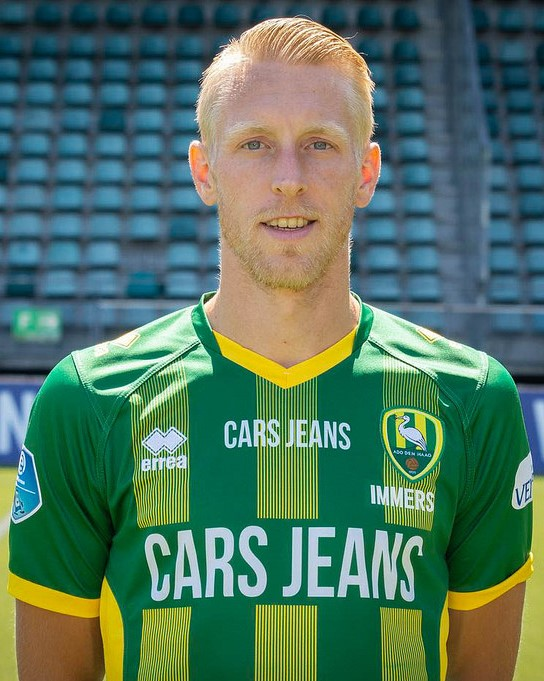
- Immers in 2018.

Personal information
- Full name: Alexander Ricard Immers
- Date of birth: 8 June 1986 (age 40)
- Place of birth: The Hague, Netherlands
- Height: 1.87 m (6 ft 2 in)
- Positions: Midfielder; forward

Youth career
- LENS
- SV DSO
- Vredenburch
- ADO Den Haag

Senior career*
Years	Team	Apps	(Gls)
2007–2012	ADO Den Haag	145	(25)
2012–2016	Feyenoord	100	(31)
2016	→ Cardiff City (loan)	15	(5)
2016–2017	Cardiff City	13	(0)
2017	Club Brugge	10	(1)
2017–2020	ADO Den Haag	90	(13)
2020–2021	NAC Breda	28	(6)
2021–2025	Scheveningen	93	(17)
- * Club domestic league appearances and goals as of 4 August 2025

Lex Immers (born 8 June 1986) is a Dutch former professional footballer who played as a midfielder and forward.

== Club career ==
=== Early career ===
Born in The Hague, Immers played for several local clubs in his youth, including amateurs LENS and Vredenburch. He also had a spell at SV DSO from Zoetermeer. ADO was impressed by his abilities, and signed him to a contract in the club's reserves.

=== ADO Den Haag ===
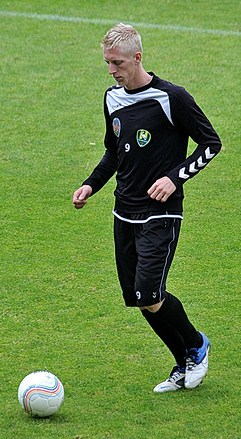
Immers training during his time at ADO Den Haag in 2011.

Immers made his professional debut on 24 August 2007, in a 2–2 draw at RKC Waalwijk, coming on as a substitute in the 74th minute for Yuri Cornelisse. Three days later on 27 August 2007, Immers scored his first ADO Den Haag goal, in a 1–0 win over Cambuur. A week later, he renewed his contract with ADO, and signed for an additional period of two years. Immers then scored his second goal on 30 September 2007, in a 2–1 win over Stormvogels. In a match against Jong Heerenveen on 1 November 2007, Immers was involved in a serious incident during the match that saw him served a two match suspension. Initially served a two match suspension, Immers’ suspension was overturned. After scoring two more goals by the end of 2007, Immers scored a further two more goals against Go Ahead Eagles and HFC Haarlem. He then scored again against Go Ahead Eagles on 22 April 2008 in the play–offs and helped the club get promoted to top–flight football for next season. Immers went on to make thirty–three appearances and scoring seven times in his first professional season at ADO Den Haag.

In the 2008–09 season, the club was playing top–flight football and Immers then scored his first goal of the season, in a 4–1 win over Twente in the first round of KNVB Cup. His first Eredivisie goal came on 17 October 2008, as well as, assisting, in a 2–0 win over Volendam. Two weeks later, on 1 November 2008, Immers scored again, in 3–1 loss against Vitesse. It wasn't until on 3 May 2009 when he scored again, in a 2–2 draw with Heerenveen. Immer went on to finish the 2008–09 season, making twenty–nine appearances and scoring four times in all competitions.

In the 2009–10 season, Immers began to receive a lot of playing time in the first team and then scored his first goal for the club, in a 2–1 win over AZ Alkmaar on 13 September 2009. Since the start of the 2009–10 season, Immers started every game until he was sent–off for a foul on Danko Lazović, in a 5–1 loss against PSV on 8 November 2009. For this, Immers was suspended for two matches, with an option extending a ban for one. Although he later return to the first team after serving a three match ban, he then suffered ankle injury in February 2010. At the end of the 2009–10 season, Immers went on to make twenty–six appearances and scoring once in all competitions.

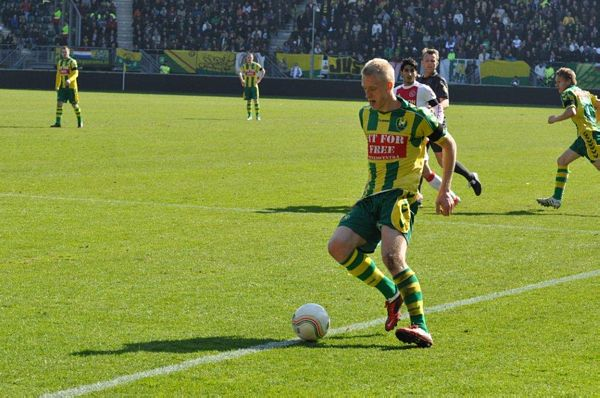
Immers playing for ADO Den Haag in a match against Ajax in 2011.

Ahead of the 2010–11 season, Immers was linked a move away from ADO Den Haag, with clubs around Europe keen on signing him. He then started the season well when he scored his first goal of the season, in a 3–1 loss against Vitesse in the opening game of the season. Immers then scored two goals in two matches between 21 September 2010 and 25 September 2010 against Excelsior '31 and Heracles Almelo. He did so again, scoring two goals in two matches between 27 October 2010 and 31 October 2010 against Groningen and Utrecht. For his performance, Immers signed a contract extension with the club, keeping him until 2014. Immers later scored three goals later in the season against Heerenveen, N.E.C. and Ajax. However, after a 3–2 victory over Ajax, Immers was fined by ADO for remarks about Jews (the nickname of Ajax supporters) the next day. The incident was caught on video and published on the internet. Immers apologized for his remarks on the ADO website. As a result, he served a four match suspension. The following year it was announced that Immers would not face any charges for his action. After returning to the first team, Immers then scored three more goals in the club's attempt to earn UEFA Europa League place against Roda JC Kerkrade and Groningen (in which he scored in both legs). At the end of the 2010–11 season, Immers went on to make thirty–six appearances and scoring twelve times in all competitions.

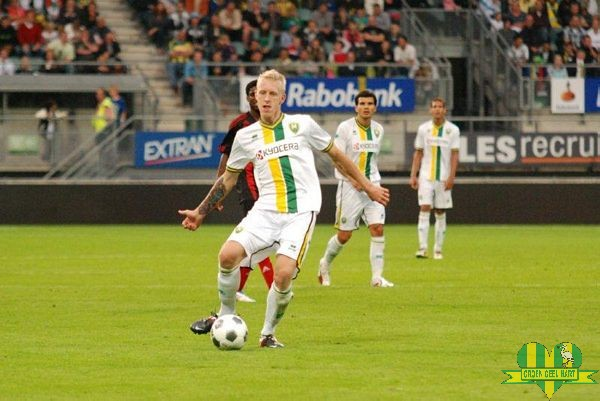
Immers playing for ADO Den Haag in a UEFA Europa League match in their first ever participant in European football.

In the 2011–12 season, Immers scored his first goals on his European debut, in a 3–2 win over Tauras Tauragė in the UEFA Europa League. At the start of the season, Immers scored in a 4–2 loss against Groningen on 14 August 2011. By the end of 2011, Immers scored three more goals against Twente, Utrecht and Heracles Almelo. It wasn't until on 12 February 2012 when he scored again, in a 1–1 draw against Utrecht. Immers then captained the side for the first time on 15 April 2012, in a 1–0 loss against Vitesse. This is followed up by scoring on 22 April 2012, in a 5–2 loss against Feyenoord. In the last game of the season, Immers captained the side for the second time, where he scored twice, in a 5–2 loss against De Graafschap. Despite being sidelined with suspensions, Immers went on to make thirty–seven appearances and scoring two times in all competitions.

At the end of the 2011–12 season, Immers announced his intentions to leave the club in the summer. During his time there, Immers soon became a force at his hometown club for which he has a well-known passion and had a tattoo of a stork on his back, a symbol associated with both the city of The Hague and of its football club ADO Den Haag.

=== Feyenoord ===
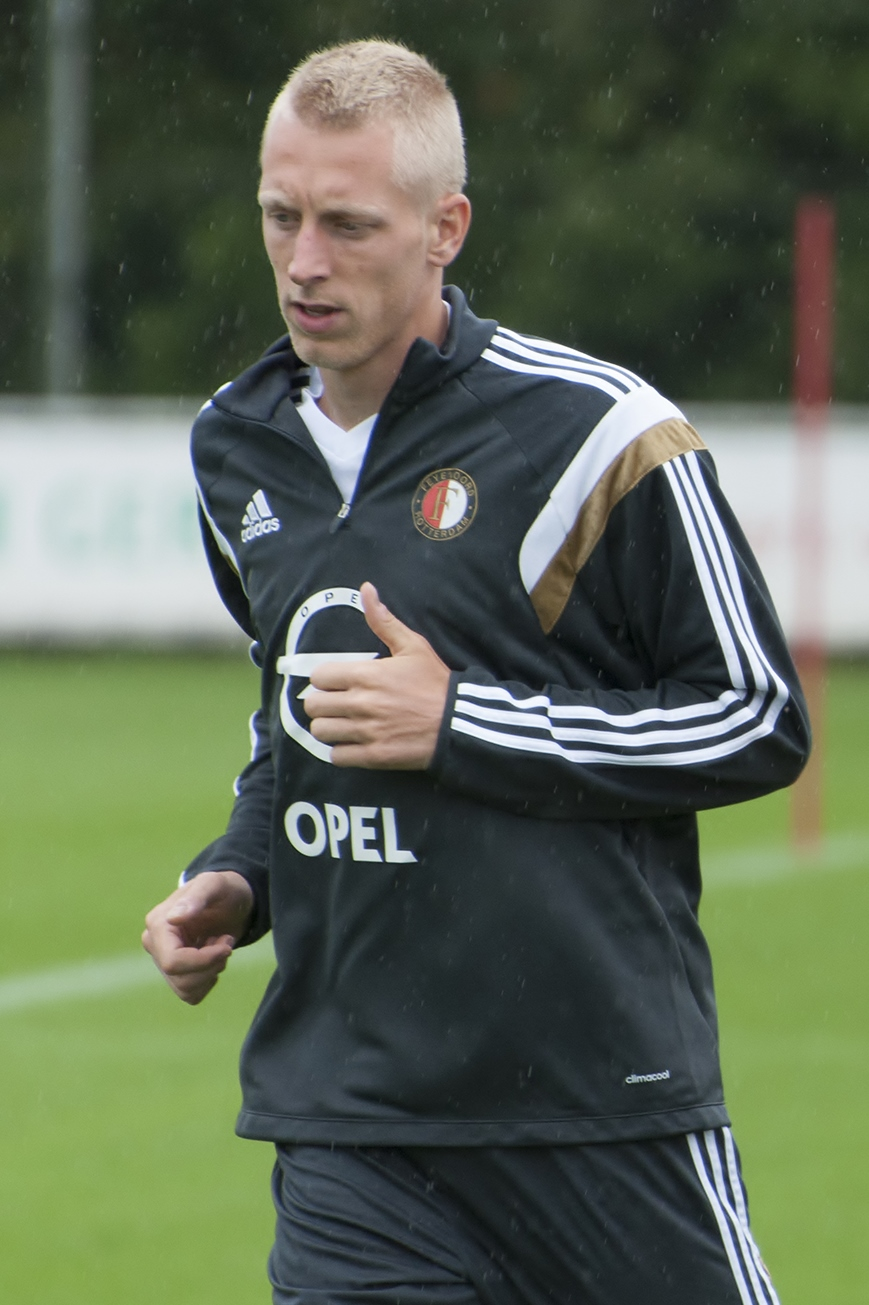
Immers training with Feyenoord in 2014.

It was announced on 1 June 2012 that Immers agreed to join Feyenoord from ADO Den Haag. Four days later, on 5 June 2012, Immers signed a contract with the club which tied him to the club until 2016. The transfer fee was not disclosed, but was believed to be approximately €1m. ADO also obtained Feyenoord youngster Kevin Jansen as part of the transaction. Immers was handed the number 10 jersey previously worn by John Guidetti.

Immers made his debut for Feyenoord on 31 July 2012, setting up a goal, in a 2–1 loss against Dynamo Kyiv in the third round first leg of the UEFA Champions League and was ultimately eliminated from tournament following a 1–0 loss in the second leg. He then made his league debut for the club, starting the whole game, in a 1–0 win over Utrecht in the opening game of the season. After scoring two goals against Heracles Almelo and PEC Zwolle, Immers then scored a hat–trick on 29 September 2012, in a 5–1 win over NEC, just three days after scoring in the KNVB Cup, in a 3–2 win. After scoring five more goals by the end of 2012, Immers, however, faced with goal drought, as he has been missing penalties and was sidelined from the first team on two occasions. Despite this, he scored two goals against Vitesse and Heracles Almelo. Elsewhere during the 2012–13 season, Immers scored three times in the KNVB Cup against NEC, Xerxes DZB and Heerenveen. At the end of the 2012–13 season, Immers went on to make forty appearances and scoring fifteen times in all competitions.

In the 2013–14 season, Immers continued to be a first team regular and was preferred in the attacking midfield since the start of the season. He scored his first goal for the club on 15 September 2013, as well as, providing one of the goals, in a 3–3 draw against NEC. By the end of 2013, he scored six goals, including Go Ahead Eagles, and PEC Zwolle (twice). As a result, on 24 October 2013, it was announced that Feyenoord hired Immers the first two years to avoid paying an agency commission. Immers went on to score five more goals and scored two goals in two matches on two occasions; one was between 4 February 2014 and 8 February 2014 against Roda JC, and NEC, while another was between 16 March 2014 and 30 March 2014 against Heerenveen Go Ahead Eagles. At the end of the 2013–14 season, having missed one match, due to suspension, Immers went on to make thirty–eight appearances and scoring twelve times in all competitions. Although he was linked a move away from the club, Immers ended the transfer speculation by signing a contract extension, keeping him until 2017.

In the 2014–15 season, Immers captained Feyenoord for the first time following an injury of their original captain Jordy Clasie and set up a goal, in a 1–1 draw against Heerenveen on 15 August 2014. He went on to captain on two occasions later in the season against Willem II and Dordrecht. Immers scored his first goal of the season, as well as, assisting twice, in a 4–0 win over Groningen on 5 October 2014. He then scored a brace on 6 December 2014, in a 5–2 win over Excelsior and then scored against them in their second meeting of the season on 22 February 2015. His goal against NAC Breda on 8 March 2015 was the first goal to score under the goal–line technology in the league, in a 3–0 win. Although he went on to score four more goals later in the season, he also scored in a UEFA Europa League match on 6 November 2014, in a 2–0 win over HNK Rijeka. Despite the 2014–15 season saw Immers plagued by injuries, he went on to make forty appearances and scoring seven times in all competitions.

However, in the 2015–16 season, Immers’ first team opportunities became limited and was placed on the substitute bench under the new management of Giovanni van Bronckhorst. Immers also faced with his own injury concerns along the way. Despite this, he went on to make seven appearances by the time he left for Feyenoord in January. During his time at Feyenoord, he was the fan favourite.

=== Cardiff City ===
Immers joined Cardiff City on loan on 21 January 2016.

After making his debut for the club, in a 2–2 draw against Rotherham United as a second-half substitute on 23 January 2016, He scored his first goal for the club on 30 January 2016 in a 3–2 win at Huddersfield Town. Three weeks later, on 20 February 2016, Immers scored again, as well as, setting up one of the goals, in a 4–1 win over Brighton & Hove Albion. Immers went on to score three more goals later in the season against Bristol City, Reading and Fulham. Immers went on to score 5 goals in 15 games for the Bluebirds, as they narrowly missed out on a play-off place.

At the end of the 2015–16 season, Immers signed a two-year deal with Cardiff City on 1 July 2016 at the opening of the summer transfer window. He also revealed he turned down at least "four clubs" to stay at the club. At the start of the 2016–17 season, Immers had a handful of first team appearances under Paul Trollope despite struggles to score goals, resulting his demotion to the substitute bench. To make matter worst, the arrival of Neil Warnock pushed Immers out of the first team, who prefers "up front with players" and "didn't have the physical presence of a Rickie Lambert or Kenneth Zohore as centre-forward." On 6 January 2017, Immers' contract was cancelled by mutual agreement. During his time at Cardiff City, Immers became the club's fan favourite.

=== Club Brugge ===
Following his release by Cardiff City, Immers joined Belgian side Club Brugge on an initial 18-month contract.

Immers made his Club Brugge debut, coming on as a late substitute, in a 3–0 win over Standard Liège on 22 January 2017. This is followed by scoring his first goal for the club, in a 2–1 win over Waasland-Beveren three days later. Although he was injured as the 2016–17 season progressed, his first team opportunities was limited and was reduced to the substitute bench, leading him to make ten appearances for the club.

However, in June 2017, it was announced that Immers left Club Brugge by mutual agreement and stated that personal reason was the main factor to his departure.

=== Return to ADO Den Haag ===
Soon after leaving Belgium, Immers returned to Netherlands, where he re–joined ADO Den Haag on 4 July 2017. Upon joining the club, he was given a number ten shirt ahead of the new season.

=== NAC Breda ===
In August 2020, Immers left ADO Den Haag. A few days later he signed a two-year contract with NAC Breda.

=== Lower leagues ===
On 2 August 2021, he joined Scheveningen in the third tier.

== Personal life ==
In an interview with Sp! Ts, Immers revealed he runs a football school for children eight and over. Immers is married to Kelly and together, the couple has three children.

In February 2016, at the time playing for Cardiff City, Immers’ house was burgled in his native country.

=== Darts ===
Immers is also a keen darts player and has participated in competitions run by the Professional Darts Corporation. Whilst at Cardiff City, Immers took on professional darts player, Eric Bristow and said facing him was an "honour."

== Career statistics ==
As of match played on 29 February 2020

Appearances and goals by club, season and competition
Club	Season	League			National cup (Note: Includes KNVB Cup, FA Cup, Belgian Cup)		Continental		Other		Total	
Club	Season	Division	Apps	Goals	Apps	Goals	Apps	Goals	Apps	Goals	Apps	Goals
ADO Den Haag	2007–08	Eerste Divisie	31	6	1	1	—		7 (Note: Appearance(s) in Eredivisie playoffs)	2	39	9
ADO Den Haag	2008–09	Eredivisie	27	3	2	1	—		—		29	4
ADO Den Haag	2009–10	Eredivisie	26	1	0	0	—		—		26	1
ADO Den Haag	2010–11	Eredivisie	30	7	2	2	—		4	3	36	12
ADO Den Haag	2011–12	Eredivisie	31	8	2	0	4	2	—		37	10
ADO Den Haag	Total		145	25	7	4	4	2	11	5	167	36
Feyenoord	2012–13	Eredivisie	32	12	4	3	4	0	—		40	15
Feyenoord	2013–14	Eredivisie	32	12	3	0	2	0	—		37	12
Feyenoord	2014–15	Eredivisie	30	7	0	0	10	1	—		40	8
Feyenoord	2015–16	Eredivisie	6	0	1	0	0	0	—		7	0
Feyenoord	Total		100	31	8	3	16	1	0	0	124	35
Cardiff City	2015–16	Championship	15	5	0	0	—		—		15	5
Cardiff City	2016–17	Championship	13	0	0	0	—		—		13	0
Cardiff City	Total		28	5	0	0	0	0	0	0	28	5
Club Brugge	2016–17	First Division	10	1	0	0	—		—		10	1
ADO Den Haag	2017–18	Eredivisie	33	4	1	0	—		2	0	36	4
ADO Den Haag	2018–19	Eredivisie	34	7	2	0	—		—		36	7
ADO Den Haag	2019–20	Eredivisie	23	2	1	0	—		—		24	2
ADO Den Haag	Total		28	5	0	0	0	0	0	0	28	5
Career total			366	73	17	7	20	3	13	5	416	88
