= Frédéric Gounongbe =

Belgian-born Beninese footballer

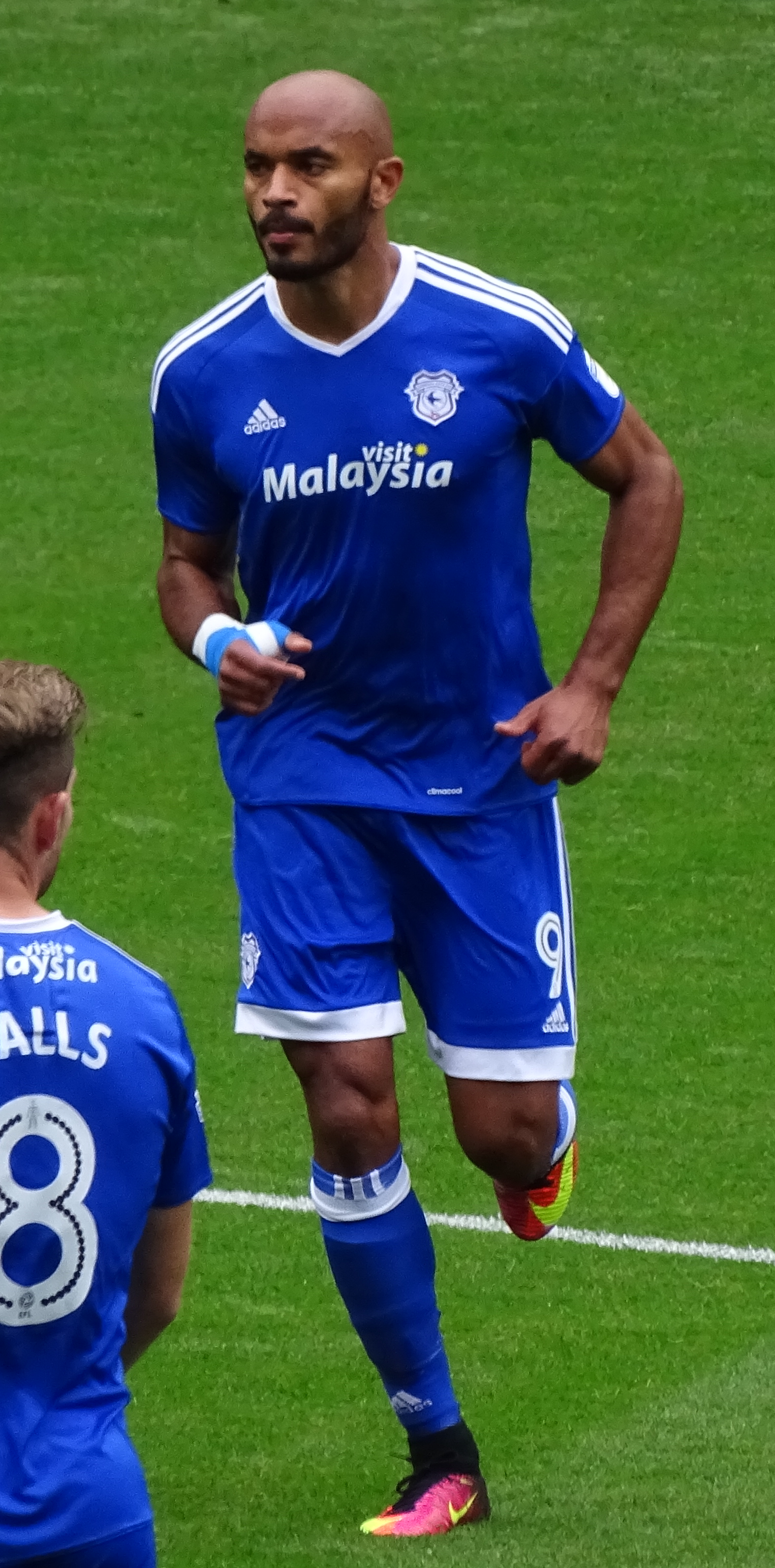
- Gounongbe playing for Cardiff City in 2016

Personal information
- Full name: Frédéric Vinami Henri Gounongbe
- Date of birth: 1 May 1988 (age 38)
- Place of birth: Brussels, Belgium
- Height: 1.90 m (6 ft 3 in)
- Position: Centre forward

Youth career
- Léopold

Senior career*
| Years | Team | Apps | (Gls) |
| 2008–2012 | Woluwe-Zaventem | 71 | (35) |
| 2012–2013 | Zulte Waregem | 0 | (0) |
| 2012–2013 | → RWDM Brussels (loan) | 28 | (9) |
| 2013–2014 | RWDM Brussels | 18 | (11) |
| 2014–2016 | Westerlo | 45 | (22) |
| 2016–2018 | Cardiff City | 14 | (0) |
| Total | | 176 | (77) |

International career^{‡}
| 2014–2016 | Benin | 7 | (3) |
- * Club domestic league appearances and goals as of 15:07, 18 July 2018 (UTC) ‡ National team caps and goals as of 06:46, 28 March 2017 (UTC)

Frédéric Vinami Henri Gounongbe (born 1 May 1988) is a former professional footballer who played as a centre forward.

A latecomer to professional football, he rose to prominence during a spell with Belgian Third Division side Woluwe-Zaventem, scoring 19 times in the 2011–12 season. His form attracted the attention of Belgian Pro League side Zulte Waregem and he joined the club on a two-year deal. However, he never appeared for the first team and after spending the 2012–13 season on loan at the club, he joined RWDM Brussels on a permanent deal. In 2014, he returned to the Pro League with Westerlo where he spent two seasons, before spending two seasons with Welsh club Cardiff City. After leaving Cardiff in 2018, he retired from football.

Born in Belgium, Gounongbe chose to represent Benin at international level, making his debut in 2014.

== Early and personal life ==
Gounongbe was born in Brussels to a Beninese father and a Belgian mother. He played tennis as a teenager and regarded the sport as his number one discipline.

He later graduated from EPHEC University College with a bachelor's degree in international business.

== Club career ==
=== Belgium ===
At the age of 16, he took up football after visiting a training session with a friend, training with local amateur sides in Auderghem before joining Belgian Fourth Division side Léopold. However, he did not become a full professional until the relatively late age of 23. He joined Woluwe-Zaventem in 2008 and attracted attention after scoring 35 goals in 71 matches for the club during a four-year spell, including 19 during the 2011–12 season in the Belgian Third Division B. His form attracted interest from several clubs and he eventually joined Belgian Pro League side Zulte Waregem on a two-year deal. The club's head scout, Toon Mertens described Gounongbe as "a powerful forward with flair to score. He has already scored 16 goals this season [...] he is lively and quick for his size".

He was named as a substitute on four occasions for the side but never made a first team appearance and eventually joined RWDM Brussels on loan in August 2012. He scored 9 goals in 28 appearances for the club but was released by Zulte Waregem on his return to the club at the end of the season, signing a permanent one-year deal with RWDM Brussels. He scored 11 times for the club during the 2013–14 season, despite being restricted to just 18 appearances due to a fibula injury. With the club experiencing financial difficulties, Gounongbe left the club at the end of the season following the end of his contract, joining newly promoted Belgian Pro League side Westerlo. He scored his first goal in the Pro League on 2 August 2014 during a 3–2 victory over Charleroi.

=== Cardiff City ===
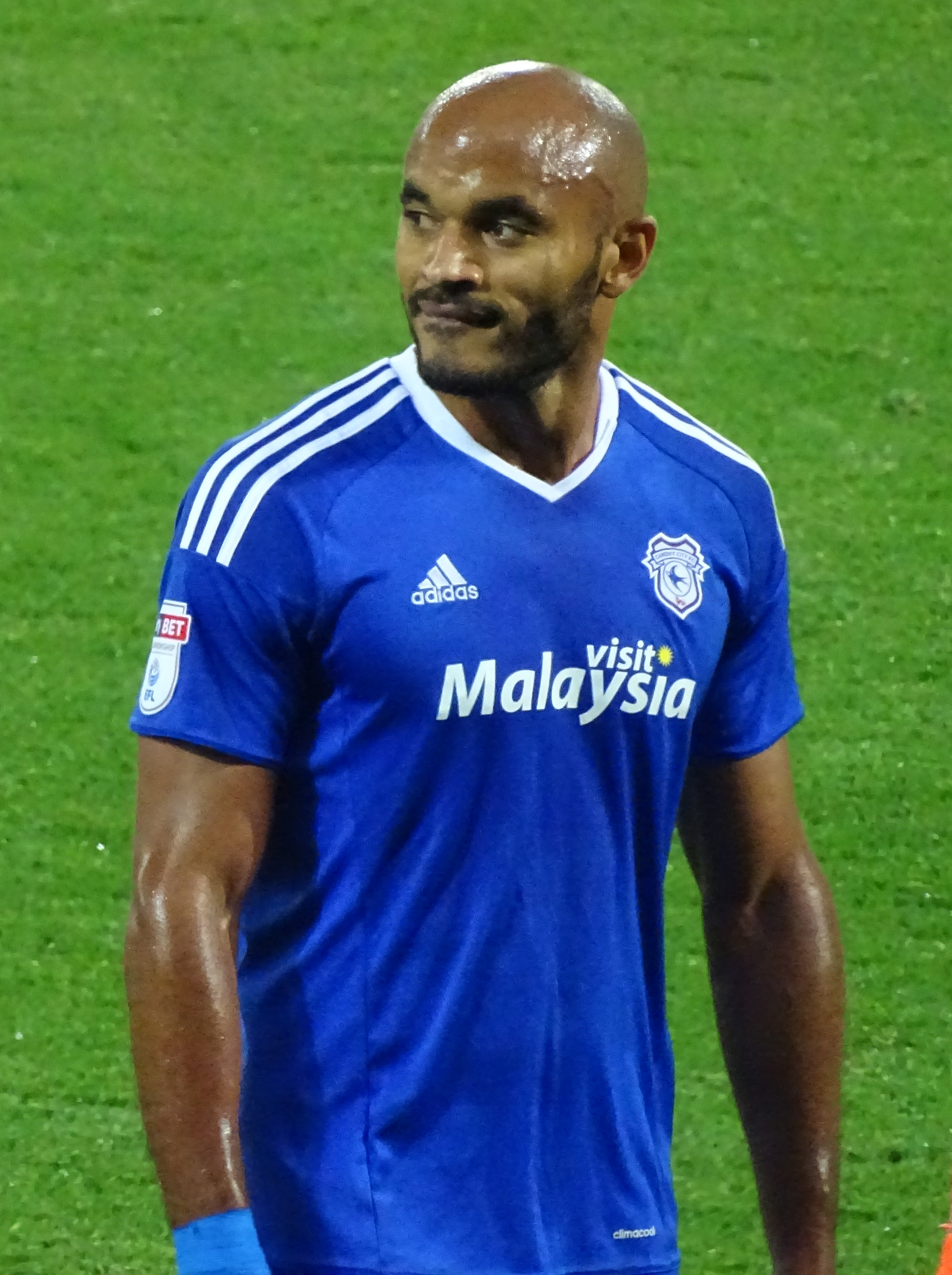
Gounongbe playing for Cardiff City in 2016

On 1 July 2016, he joined Football League Championship side Cardiff City on a free transfer following the expiry of his contract at Westerlo, signing a two-year deal. He made his debut for the club in a 0–0 draw with Birmingham City on the opening day of the 2016–17 season. Gounongbe failed to score in nine games and was eventually dropped by new manager, Neil Warnock. He made three more substitute appearances before suffering an injury that required surgery, ruling him out of the rest of the season.

He made his return on 18 November, coming on a substitute against Brentford, playing two more games before suffering a groin injury, which ruled him out for several months. Gounongbe was released at the end of the 2017–18 season, following Cardiff's promotion to the Premier League. Following his departure, he decided to retire from football on doctor's advice due to a long-term injury.

== International career ==
Gounongbe received his first call-up to the Benin national football team from manager Didier Ollé-Nicolle in 2014, making his debut on 17 May 2014 as a substitute in place of Mohamed Aoudou during a 2–0 victory over São Tomé and Príncipe in the first leg of the first qualifying round for the 2015 Africa Cup of Nations. In the second leg of the fixture, Gounongbe was handed his first start for Benin, scoring his first international goal in his home debut in Porto-Novo before being substituted late in the match for Razak Omotoyossi.

=== International goals ===
International goals by date, venue, cap, opponent, score, result and competition
| No. | Date | Venue | Opponent | Score | Result | Competition |
|---|---|---|---|---|---|---|
| 1 | 1 June 2014 | Stade Charles de Gaulle, Porto-Novo, Benin | São Tomé and Príncipe | 1–0 | 2–0 | 2015 Africa Cup of Nations qualification |
| 2 | 23 March 2016 | Juba Stadium, Juba, South Sudan | South Sudan | 1–0 | 2–1 | 2017 Africa Cup of Nations qualification |
| 3 | 4 September 2016 | Stade du 26 Mars, Bamako, Mali | Mali | 1–3 | 2–5 | 2017 Africa Cup of Nations qualification |

== After football ==
Following his retirement, Gounongbe attended university and graduated in asset management.

== Career statistics ==
Appearances and goals by club, season and competition
| Club | Season | League | | | National Cup | | League Cup | | Other | | Total | |
| Club | Season | Division | Apps | Goals | Apps | Goals | Apps | Goals | Apps | Goals | Apps | Goals |
|---|---|---|---|---|---|---|---|---|---|---|---|---|
| Woluwe-Zaventem | 2009–10 | Third Division B | 23 | 10 | 1 | 0 | 0 | 0 | 0 | 0 | 24 | 10 |
| Woluwe-Zaventem | 2010–11 | Third Division B | 15 | 6 | 0 | 0 | 0 | 0 | 0 | 0 | 15 | 6 |
| Woluwe-Zaventem | 2011–12 | Third Division B | 33 | 19 | 2 | 1 | 0 | 0 | 0 | 0 | 35 | 20 |
| Woluwe-Zaventem | Woluwe-Zaventem total | | 71 | 35 | 3 | 1 | 0 | 0 | 0 | 0 | 74 | 36 |
| Zulte Waregem | 2012–13 | Pro League | 0 | 0 | 0 | 0 | 0 | 0 | 0 | 0 | 0 | 0 |
| RWDM Brussels (loan) | 2012–13 | Second Division | 28 | 9 | 1 | 0 | 0 | 0 | 0 | 0 | 29 | 9 |
| RWDM Brussels | 2013–14 | Second Division | 18 | 11 | 0 | 0 | 0 | 0 | 0 | 0 | 18 | 11 |
| RWDM Brussels | RWDM Brussels total | | 46 | 20 | 1 | 0 | 0 | 0 | 0 | 0 | 47 | 20 |
| Westerlo | 2014–15 | Pro League | 17 | 9 | 0 | 0 | 0 | 0 | 0 | 0 | 17 | 9 |
| Westerlo | 2015–16 | Pro League | 28 | 13 | 2 | 0 | 0 | 0 | 0 | 0 | 30 | 13 |
| Westerlo | Westerlo total | | 45 | 22 | 2 | 0 | 0 | 0 | 0 | 0 | 47 | 22 |
| Cardiff City | 2016–17 | Championship | 11 | 0 | 0 | 0 | 1 | 0 | 0 | 0 | 12 | 0 |
| Cardiff City | 2017–18 | Championship | 3 | 0 | 0 | 0 | 0 | 0 | 0 | 0 | 3 | 0 |
| Cardiff City | Cardiff City total | | 14 | 0 | 0 | 0 | 1 | 0 | 0 | 0 | 15 | 0 |
| Total | | | 176 | 77 | 6 | 1 | 1 | 0 | 0 | 0 | 183 | 78 |
