= 2023–24 Cardiff City F.C. season =

Welsh football club season

Cardiff City
2023–24 season
- Owner: Vincent Tan
- Chairman: Mehmet Dalman
- Manager: Erol Bulut
- Stadium: Cardiff City Stadium
- Championship: 12th
- FA Cup: Third round
- EFL Cup: Third round
- Top goalscorer: League: Perry Ng (6); Karlan Grant (6); All: Kion Etete (6); Perry Ng (6); Karlan Grant (6)
- Highest home attendance: 28,648 vs. Swansea City, 16 September 2023
- Lowest home attendance: 17,131 vs. Blackburn Rovers, 20 February 2024
- Average home league attendance: 21,213
- Biggest win: 4–0 vs. Huddersfield Town, 25 October 2023
- Biggest defeat: 1–4 vs. Norwich City, 17 February 2024; 1–4 vs. Middlesbrough, 27 April 2024; 2-5 vs. Rotherham, 4 May 2024
Home colours	Away colours	Third colours
- All statistics correct as of 4 May 2024.

The 2023–24 season was the 125th season in the history of Cardiff City and their fifth consecutive season in the Championship. The club were participating in the Championship, the FA Cup, and the EFL Cup.

== Current squad ==
As of 4 May 2024

Note: Flags indicate national team as has been defined under FIFA eligibility rules. Players may hold more than one non-FIFA nationality.

No.	Name	Nat.	Position(s)	Date of birth (age)	Apps.	Goals	Year signed	Signed from	Transfer fee	Ends
Goalkeepers
1	Ethan Horvath	(United States)	GK	9 June 1995 (age 31)	16	0	2024	(England) Nottingham Forest	Undisclosed	2027
21	Jak Alnwick	(England)	GK	17 June 1993 (age 33)	32	0	2022	(Scotland) St Mirren	Free	2025
28	Rohan Luthra	(England)	GK	6 May 2002 (age 24)	1	0	2021	(England) Crystal Palace	Free	2024
41	Matthew Turner	(Wales)	GK	27 March 2002 (age 24)	0	0	2021	(England) Leeds United	Free	2024
Defenders
2	Mahlon Romeo	(Antigua and Barbuda) (England)	RB/RM	19 September 1995 (age 31)	51	0	2022	(England) Millwall	Undisclosed	2025
4	Dimitrios Goutas	(Greece)	CB	4 April 1994 (age 32)	45	4	2023	(Turkey) Sivasspor	Free	2025
5	Mark McGuinness	(Republic of Ireland) (England)	CB	5 January 2001 (age 25)	84	4	2021	(England) Arsenal	Undisclosed	2027
12	Nat Phillips	(England)	CB	21 March 1997 (age 29)	18	1	2024	(England) Liverpool	Loan	2024
15	Oliver Denham	(Wales) (England)	CB/RB	4 May 2002 (age 24)	8	0	2021	(England) Manchester United	Trainee	2024
17	Jamilu Collins	(Nigeria)	LB/CB/LM	5 August 1994 (age 32)	40	1	2022	(Germany) SC Paderborn	Free	2024
30	Josh Wilson-Esbrand	(England)	LB	26 December 2002 (age 23)	11	0	2024	(England) Manchester City	Loan	2024
38	Perry Ng	(England) (Singapore)	RB/LB/CB	27 April 1996 (age 30)	144	8	2021	(England) Crewe Alexandra	£350,000	2026
Midfielders
6	Ryan Wintle	(England)	DM/CM/CB	13 June 1997 (age 29)	117	5	2021	(England) Crewe Alexandra	Free	2026
8	Joe Ralls	(England)	CM/LM/DM	12 October 1993 (age 33)	386	34	2011	Academy	Trainee	2025
10	Aaron Ramsey	(Wales)	CM/AM	26 December 1990 (age 35)	41	6	2023	(France) Nice	Free	2025
11	Callum O'Dowda	(Republic of Ireland) (England)	LW/AM/RW/LWB	23 April 1995 (age 31)	51	4	2022	(England) Bristol City	Free	2025
15	David Turnbill	(Scotland)	AM	10 July 1999 (age 27)	17	0	2024	(Scotland) Celtic	Undisclosed	2027
19	Romaine Sawyers	(Saint Kitts and Nevis) (England)	AM/CM/SS	2 November 1991 (age 35)	44	3	2022	(England) West Bromwich Albion	Free	2024
23	Manolis Siopis	(Greece)	CM	14 May 1994 (age 32)	41	0	2023	(Turkey) Trabzonspor	Free	2026
27	Rubin Colwill	(Wales)	AM/LW/RW	27 April 2002 (age 24)	105	9	2020	Academy	Trainee	2027
32	Ollie Tanner	(England)	LW/AM/RW	13 May 2002 (age 24)	40	2	2022	(England) Lewes	£50,000	2027
34	Joel Colwill	(Wales)	CM	27 October 2004 (age 22)	5	0	2022	Academy	Trainee	2028
45	Cian Ashford	(Wales)	AM/LW/RW	24 September 2004 (age 22)	9	1	2022	Academy	Trainee	2027
Forwards
9	Kion Etete	(England) (Nigeria)	CF/SS	28 November 2001 (age 24)	61	9	2022	(England) Tottenham Hotspur	£500,000	2025
14	Josh Bowler	(England)	RW/LW	5 March 1999 (age 27)	38	5	2023	(England) Nottingham Forest	Loan	2024
16	Karlan Grant	(England)	CF/LW	18 September 1997 (age 29)	39	6	2023	(England) West Bromwich Albion	Loan	2024
20	Famara Diédhiou	(Senegal)	CF	15 December 1992 (age 33)	16	2	2024	(Spain) Granada	Loan	2024
22	Yakou Méïté	(Ivory Coast) (France)	LW/CF/RW	11 February 1996 (age 30)	37	2	2023	(England) Reading	Free	2025
47	Callum Robinson	(Republic of Ireland)	LW/CF/RW	2 February 1995 (age 31)	47	10	2022	(England) West Bromwich Albion	£1,500,000	2025
Out on Loan
3	Joel Bagan	(Republic of Ireland) (England)	LB	3 September 2001 (age 25)	42	3	2020	Academy	Trainee	2026
18	Ebou Adams	(The Gambia) (England)	CM/DM/AM	15 January 1996 (age 30)	12	0	2022	(England) Forest Green Rovers	Free	2025
25	Kieron Evans	(Wales)	AM	19 December 2001 (age 24)	11	1	2020	Academy	Trainee	2024
35	Andy Rinomhota	(Zimbabwe)	CM/DM/RM	21 April 1997 (age 29)	48	0	2022	(England) Reading	Free	2025
39	Isaak Davies	(Wales)	SS/RW/LW	25 September 2001 (age 25)	42	4	2020	Academy	Trainee	2025
44	Xavier Benjamin	(England)	CB	11 January 2004 (age 22)	2	0	2022	(England) Fulham	Academy	2024
54	Sheyi Ojo	(England)	LW/RW/SS	19 June 1997 (age 29)	81	7	2022	(England) Liverpool	Free	2024
—	Eli King	(England)	DM/CM	23 December 2002 (age 23)	7	0	2021	Academy	Trainee	2026
	Ryotaro Tsunoda	(Japan)	CB/LB	27 June 1999 (age 27)	0	0	2024	(Japan) Yokohama F. Marinos	Undisclosed	

== Statistics ==
As of 4 May 2024
Players with names in italics and marked * were on loan from another club for the whole of their season with Cardiff City.

No.	Pos	Nat	Player	Total		Championship		FA Cup		EFL Cup	
No.	Pos	Nat	Player	Apps	Goals	Apps	Goals	Apps	Goals	Apps	Goals
1	GK	(United States) USA	Ethan Horvath	16	0	16+0	0	0+0	0	0+0	0
2	DF	(Antigua and Barbuda) ANT	Mahlon Romeo	18	0	8+7	0	0+0	0	3+0	0
4	DF	(Greece) GRE	Dimitrios Goutas	45	4	45+0	4	0+0	0	0+0	0
5	DF	(Republic of Ireland) IRL	Mark McGuinness	30	2	28+1	2	0+0	0	0+1	0
6	MF	(England) ENG	Ryan Wintle	44	3	27+15	2	1+0	0	1+0	1
8	MF	(England) ENG	Joe Ralls	35	1	32+3	1	0+0	0	0+0	0
9	FW	(England) ENG	Kion Etete	31	6	12+15	3	1+0	0	3+0	3
10	MF	(Wales) WAL	Aaron Ramsey	12	3	6+6	3	0+0	0	0+0	0
11	MF	(Republic of Ireland) IRL	Callum O'Dowda	11	1	5+6	1	0+0	0	0+0	0
12	DF	(England) ENG	Nathaniel Phillips*	18	1	17+1	1	0+0	0	0+0	0
14	FW	(England) ENG	Josh Bowler*	39	5	31+7	5	1+0	0	0+0	0
15	MF	(Scotland) SCO	David Turnbull	17	0	11+6	0	0+0	0	0+0	0
16	FW	(England) ENG	Karlan Grant*	39	6	36+2	6	0+0	0	1+0	0
17	DF	(Nigeria) NGR	Jamilu Collins	36	1	32+3	1	0+0	0	1+0	0
19	MF	(Saint Kitts and Nevis) SKN	Romaine Sawyers	5	0	0+1	0	1+0	0	3+0	0
20	FW	(Senegal) SEN	Famara Diédhiou*	16	2	5+11	2	0+0	0	0+0	0
21	GK	(England) ENG	Jak Alnwick	25	0	23+0	0	1+0	0	1+0	0
22	FW	(Ivory Coast) CIV	Yakou Méïté	37	2	24+13	2	0+0	0	0+0	0
23	MF	(Greece) GRE	Manolis Siopis	42	0	37+5	0	0+0	0	0+0	0
27	MF	(Wales) WAL	Rubin Colwill	38	3	13+21	1	1+0	0	3+0	2
30	DF	(England) ENG	Josh Wilson-Esbrand*	11	0	8+3	0	0+0	0	0+0	0
32	MF	(England) ENG	Ollie Tanner	38	2	9+25	2	1+0	0	3+0	0
34	MF	(Wales) WAL	Joel Colwill	5	0	0+2	0	0+1	0	0+2	0
36	MF	(England) ENG	Raheem Conte	3	0	0+3	0	0+0	0	0+0	0
38	DF	(England) ENG	Perry Ng	40	6	38+0	6	1+0	0	1+0	0
40	DF	(England) ENG	Josh Beecher	1	0	0+0	0	0+0	0	0+1	0
44	DF	(England) ENG	Xavier Benjamin	2	0	0+0	0	1+0	0	1+0	0
45	MF	(Wales) WAL	Cian Ashford	9	1	3+2	1	0+1	0	0+3	0
47	FW	(Republic of Ireland) IRL	Callum Robinson	24	3	9+13	2	1+0	0	1+0	1
48	MF	(England) ENG	Cameron Antwi	1	0	0+0	0	0+1	0	0+0	0
49	DF	(Wales) WAL	Luey Giles	2	0	0+2	0	0+0	0	0+0	0
Out on Loan:
3	DF	(Republic of Ireland) IRL	Joel Bagan	1	0	0+0	0	0+0	0	0+1	0
18	MF	(The Gambia) GAM	Ebou Adams	12	0	2+8	0	0+0	0	2+0	0
25	MF	(Wales) WAL	Kieron Evans	4	0	0+0	0	0+1	0	2+1	0
33	FW	(Wales) WAL	James Crole	1	0	0+0	0	0+0	0	0+1	0
35	MF	(Zimbabwe) ZIM	Andy Rinomhota	6	0	1+2	0	1+0	0	2+0	0
54	FW	(England) ENG	Sheyi Ojo	1	0	0+0	0	0+0	0	0+1	0
Players who have left the club:
12	FW	(Canada) CAN	Iké Ugbo*	20	4	9+9	4	0+0	0	0+2	0
13	GK	(Iceland) ISL	Rúnar Alex Rúnarsson*	8	0	6+0	0	0+0	0	2+0	0
24	DF	(England) ENG	Jonathan Panzo*	5	0	0+4	0	0+0	0	1+0	0
26	DF	(England) ENG	Jack Simpson	2	0	0+1	0	0+0	0	1+0	0

=== Goals record ===
As of 4 May 2024

Rank	No.	Nat.	Po.	Name	Championship	FA Cup	EFL Cup	Total
1	9	(England)	CF	Kion Etete	3	0	3	6
1	16	(England)	CF	Karlan Grant	6	0	0	6
1	38	(England)	RB	Perry Ng	6	0	0	6
4	14	(England)	RW	Josh Bowler	5	0	0	5
5	4	(Greece)	CB	Dimitrios Goutas	4	0	0	4
5	12	(Canada)	CF	Iké Ugbo	4	0	0	4
5	Own Goals				4	0	0	4
8	6	(England)	DM	Ryan Wintle	2	0	1	3
8	10	(Wales)	CM	Aaron Ramsey	3	0	0	3
8	27	(Wales)	AM	Rubin Colwill	1	0	2	3
8	47	(Republic of Ireland)	LW	Callum Robinson	2	0	1	3
12	5	(Republic of Ireland)	CB	Mark McGuinness	2	0	0	2
12	20	(Senegal)	CF	Famara Diédhiou	2	0	0	2
12	22	(Ivory Coast)	CF	Yakou Méïté	2	0	0	2
12	32	(England)	RW	Ollie Tanner	2	0	0	2
16	8	(England)	CM	Joe Ralls	1	0	0	1
16	11	(Republic of Ireland)	LM	Callum O'Dowda	1	0	0	1
16	12	(England)	CB	Nathaniel Phillips	1	0	0	1
16	17	(Nigeria)	LB	Jamilu Collins	1	0	0	1
16	45	(Wales)	AM	Cian Ashford	1	0	0	1
Total					51	0	7	58

=== Assists record ===
As of 4 May 2024

Rank	No.	Nat.	Po.	Name	Championship	FA Cup	EFL Cup	Total
1	8	(England)	CM	Joe Ralls	7	0	0	7
2	6	(England)	DM	Ryan Wintle	4	0	0	4
2	27	(Wales)	AM	Rubin Colwill	2	0	2	4
2	38	(England)	RB	Perry Ng	4	0	0	4
5	16	(England)	CF	Karlan Grant	2	0	1	3
5	17	(Nigeria)	LB	Jamilu Collins	3	0	0	3
7	14	(England)	RW	Josh Bowler	2	0	0	2
7	47	(Republic of Ireland)	LW	Callum Robinson	2	0	0	2
9	11	(Republic of Ireland)	LM	Callum O'Dowda	1	0	0	1
9	12	(Canada)	CF	Iké Ugbo	1	0	0	1
9	15	(Scotland)	AM	David Turnbull	1	0	0	1
9	19	(Saint Kitts and Nevis)	AM	Romaine Sawyers	0	0	1	1
9	22	(Ivory Coast)	CF	Yakou Méïté	1	0	0	1
9	25	(Wales)	AM	Kieron Evans	0	0	1	1
9	32	(England)	RW	Ollie Tanner	1	0	0	1
9	35	(Zimbabwe)	CM	Andy Rinomhota	0	0	1	1
9	45	(Wales)	AM	Cian Ashford	1	0	0	1
9	49	(Wales)	LB	Luey Giles	1	0	0	1
Total					33	0	6	39

=== Disciplinary record ===
As of 5 May 2024

Rank	No.	Nat.	Po.	Name	Championship			FA Cup			EFL Cup			Total		
Rank	No.	Nat.	Po.	Name	Yellow card	(yellow card) (yellow-red card)	Red card	Yellow card	(yellow card) (yellow-red card)	Red card	Yellow card	(yellow card) (yellow-red card)	Red card	Yellow card	(yellow card) (yellow-red card)	Red card
1	38	(England)	RB	Perry Ng	9	0	0	0	0	0	0	0	0	9	0	0
2	4	(Greece)	CB	Dimitrios Goutas	8	0	0	0	0	0	0	0	0	8	0	0
2	17	(Nigeria)	LB	Jamilu Collins	8	0	0	0	0	0	0	0	0	8	0	0
4	22	(Ivory Coast)	LW	Yakou Méïté	7	0	0	0	0	0	0	0	0	7	0	0
4	14	(England)	RW	Josh Bowler	5	0	0	1	0	0	0	0	0	6	0	0
5	23	(Greece)	CM	Manolis Siopis	5	0	0	0	0	0	0	0	0	5	0	0
5	27	(Wales)	AM	Rubin Colwill	4	0	0	0	0	0	1	0	0	5	0	0
8	6	(England)	DM	Ryan Wintle	4	0	0	0	0	0	0	0	0	4	0	0
9	8	(England)	CM	Joe Ralls	3	0	0	0	0	0	0	0	0	3	0	0
9	9	(England)	CF	Kion Etete	2	0	0	0	0	0	1	0	0	3	0	0
9	16	(England)	CF	Karlan Grant	3	0	0	0	0	0	0	0	0	3	0	0
9	18	(The Gambia)	CM	Ebou Adams	3	0	0	0	0	0	0	0	0	3	0	0
9	32	(England)	RW	Ollie Tanner	3	0	0	0	0	0	0	0	0	3	0	0
14	2	(Antigua and Barbuda)	RB	Mahlon Romeo	0	1	0	0	0	0	1	0	0	1	1	0
14	5	(Republic of Ireland)	CB	Mark McGuinness	2	0	0	0	0	0	0	0	0	2	0	0
14	10	(Wales)	CM	Aaron Ramsey	2	0	0	0	0	0	0	0	0	2	0	0
14	12	(England)	CB	Nathaniel Phillips	2	0	0	0	0	0	0	0	0	2	0	0
14	24	(England)	CB	Jonathan Panzo	2	0	0	0	0	0	0	0	0	2	0	0
20	15	(Scotland)	AM	David Turnbull	1	0	0	0	0	0	0	0	0	1	0	0
20	21	(England)	GK	Jak Alnwick	1	0	0	0	0	0	0	0	0	1	0	0
20	~~26~~	(England)	CB	Jack Simpson	1	0	0	0	0	0	0	0	0	1	0	0
20	30	(England)	LB	Josh Wilson-Esbrand	1	0	0	0	0	0	0	0	0	1	0	0
20	35	(Zimbabwe)	CM	Andy Rinomhota	0	0	0	0	0	0	1	0	0	1	0	0
20	44	(England)	CB	Xavier Benjamin	0	0	0	1	0	0	0	0	0	1	0	0
Total					76	1	0	2	0	0	4	0	0	82	1	0

=== Clean sheets ===
Includes all competitive matches. The list is sorted by squad number when total clean sheets are equal. Numbers in parentheses represent games where both goalkeepers participated and both kept a clean sheet; the number in parentheses is awarded to the goalkeeper who was substituted on, whilst a full clean sheet is awarded to the goalkeeper who was on the field at the start of play.

As of match played 5 May 2024

Rank	No.	Nat.	Name	Matches played	Championship	FA Cup	EFL Cup	Total
1	21	(England)	Jak Alnwick	25	7	0	0	7
2	1	(United States)	Ethan Horvath	16	4	0	0	4
3	~~13~~	(Iceland)	Rúnar Alex Rúnarsson	8	1	0	0	1

=== Captains ===
Correct as of match played on 5 May 2024

No.	Nat.	Pos.	Name	Championship	FA Cup	EFL Cup	Total
8	(England)	CM	Joe Ralls	30	0	0	30
6	(England)	CM	Ryan Wintle	11	1	1	13
10	(Wales)	CM	Aaron Ramsey	2	0	0	2
19	(Saint Kitts and Nevis)	AM	Romaine Sawyers	0	0	1	1
21	(England)	GK	Jak Alnwick	0	0	1	1

=== Contracts ===
Date	Position	Nationality	Name	Status	Contract Length	Expiry Date	Ref.
9 June 2023	CF	(Wales)	Mark Harris	Rejected	0 years	June 2023	
9 June 2023	LB	(Republic of Ireland)	Joel Bagan	Signed	3 years	June 2026	
9 June 2023	DM	(Wales)	Eli King	Signed	3 years	June 2026	
4 August 2023	DM	(England)	Ryan Wintle	Signed	3 years	June 2026	
17 August 2023	CB	(England)	Mark McGuinness	Signed	4 years	June 2027	
24 August 2023	RB	(England)	Perry Ng	Signed	3 years	June 2026	
15 September 2023	CM	(Wales)	Joel Colwill	Signed	5 years	June 2028	
15 September 2023	AM	(Wales)	Rubin Colwill	Signed	4 years	June 2027	
18 September 2023	GK	(England)	Jak Alnwick	Signed	1 year	June 2025	
19 January 2024	AM	(Wales)	Cian Ashford	Signed	3 1/2 years	June 2027	
11 March 2024	CM	(England)	Joe Ralls	Signed	1 year	June 2025	

== Transfers ==
=== In ===
Date	Pos	Player	Transferred from	Fee	Ref
5 July 2023	CB	(Greece) Dimitrios Goutas	(Turkey) Sivasspor	Free Transfer	
6 July 2023	CB	(England) Freddie Cook †	(England) Leicester City	Free Transfer	
7 July 2023	LW	(Ivory Coast) Yakou Méïté	(England) Reading	Free Transfer	
15 July 2023	CM	(Wales) Aaron Ramsey	(France) Nice	Free Transfer	
21 July 2023	CF	(England) Finlay Johnson ‡	(England) Stevenage	Compensation	
18 August 2023	CM	(Greece) Manolis Siopis	(Turkey) Trabzonspor	Free Transfer	
15 September 2023	GK	(Wales) Corey Foggarty †	(Wales) Cambrian & Clydach Vale	Free Transfer	
19 September 2023	CB	(England) Malachi Fagan-Walcott ‡	Free agent	—N/a	
23 January 2024	CB	(Japan) Ryotaro Tsunoda	(Japan) Yokohama F. Marinos	Undisclosed	
1 February 2024	GK	(United States) Ethan Horvath	(England) Nottingham Forest	Undisclosed	
1 February 2024	AM	(Scotland) David Turnbull	(Scotland) Celtic	Undisclosed	

‡ Signed initially for the Under-21s
† Signed initially for the academy

=== Out ===
Date	Pos	Player	Transferred to	Fee	Ref
30 June 2023	CB	(Wales) Jac Clay	(Wales) Pontyclun	Released	
30 June 2023	CF	(Wales) Mark Harris	(England) Oxford United	Released	
30 June 2023	DM	(Wales) Taylor Jones	(Wales) Cambrian & Clydach Vale	Released	
30 June 2023	RW	(England) Jack Leahy	(England) Hornchurch	Released	
30 June 2023	CB	(Wales) Aidan MacNamara	(Wales) Haverfordwest County	Released	
30 June 2023	GK	(England) Dillon Phillips	(England) Rotherham United	Released	
30 June 2023	CB	(Wales) Owen Pritchard	(Wales) Pontypridd United	Released	
30 June 2023	RB	(England) Tom Sang	(England) Port Vale	Released	
30 June 2023	RW	(Northern Ireland) Gavin Whyte	(England) Portsmouth	Released	
30 June 2023	CF	(England) Connor Wickham	Free agent	Released	
24 July 2023	CF	(England) Max Watters	(England) Barnsley	Undisclosed	
30 August 2023	GK	(England) Ryan Allsop	(England) Hull City	Undisclosed	
31 August 2023	CB	(England) Jack Simpson	Free agent	Mutual Consent	
1 February 2024	RB	(England) Vontae Daley-Campbell	(England) Peterborough United	Mutual Consent	

=== Loaned in ===
Date	Pos	Player	Loaned from	Date until	Ref
4 July 2023	CF	(Canada) Iké Ugbo	(France) Troyes	11 January 2024 (Note: On 11 January, Ugbo was recalled early to Troyes.)	
15 July 2023	CF	(England) Karlan Grant	(England) West Bromwich Albion	End of Season	
1 August 2023	RW	(England) Josh Bowler	(England) Nottingham Forest	End of Season	
18 August 2023	GK	(Iceland) Rúnar Alex Rúnarsson	(England) Arsenal	1 February 2024 (Note: On 1 February, Rúnarsson was recalled early to Arsenal.)	
1 September 2023	CB	(England) Jonathan Panzo	(England) Nottingham Forest	End of Season	
30 January 2024	CB	(England) Nat Phillips	(England) Liverpool	End of Season	
31 January 2024	CF	(Senegal) Famara Diédhiou	(Spain) Granada	End of Season	
1 February 2024	LB	(England) Josh Wilson-Esbrand	(England) Manchester City	End of Season	

=== Loaned out ===
Date	Pos	Player	Loaned to	End date	Ref
10 July 2023	CB	(Wales) Oliver Denham	(Scotland) Dundee United	22 January 2024 (Note: On 22 January 2024, Denham was recalled early from his season-long loan at Dundee United.)	
26 July 2023	LB	(Wales) Tom Davies	(Scotland) Kilmarnock	End of Season	
28 July 2023	DM	(Wales) Eli King	(England) Morecambe	8 January 2024 (Note: On 8 January, King was recalled early from his season-long loan at Morecambe.)	
2 August 2023	SS	(Wales) Isaak Davies	(Belgium) Kortrijk	End of Season	
11 August 2023	LB	(Republic of Ireland) Joel Bagan	(Belgium) Zulte Waregem	End of Season	
16 August 2023	LW	(England) Sheyi Ojo	(Belgium) Kortijk	End of Season	
24 August 2023	GK	(England) Rohan Luthra	(England) Slough Town	1 January 2024	
26 August 2023	CF	(England) Chanka Zimba	(England) Maidenhead United	End of Season (Note: On 8 January, Zimba's loan at Maidenhead United was extended until the end of season.)	
12 January 2024	CB	(England) Malachi Fagan-Walcott	(Scotland) Dunfermline Athletic	End of Season	
15 January 2024	DM	(Wales) Eli King	(Scotland) Ross County	End of Season	
17 January 2024	AM	(Wales) Kieron Evans	(England) Gateshead	End of Season	
23 January 2024	CB	(Japan) Ryotaro Tsunoda	(Belgium) Kortijk	End of Season	
31 January 2024	CM	(The Gambia) Ebou Adams	(England) Derby County	End of Season	
31 January 2024	CF	(Wales) James Crole	(Scotland) Queen's Park	End of Season	
1 February 2024	RB	(England) Xavier Benjamin	(Scotland) Dunfermline Athletic	End of Season	
1 February 2024	GK	(Wales) Jake Dennis	(England) Gloucester City	End of Season	
1 February 2024	CM	(Wales) Ryan kavanagh	(England) Truro City	End of Season	
1 February 2024	CM	(Zimbabwe) Andy Rinomhota	(England) Rotherham United	End of Season	
2 February 2024	CB	(Wales) Oliver Denham	(Republic of Ireland) Sligo Rovers	End of Season	

== Pre-season and friendlies ==
On 9 June, Cardiff City announced their first pre-season friendly, against Wycombe Wanderers to contest Joe Jacobson's testimonial. Two weeks later, two home friendlies were confirmed, against Penybont and The New Saints. Two behind-closed-doors fixtures were also included during pre-season, against Cambridge United and Bristol Rovers.

Win Draw Loss Fixtures

1 July 2023 Friendly	Cardiff City	2–0	Penybont	Leckwith
15:00 BST	McGuinness 11'; Tanner 80'	Cardiff City Official Site		Stadium: Cardiff City Stadium

4 July 2023 Friendly	Cardiff City	3–1	The New Saints	Leckwith
19:30 BST	Robinson 11'; McGuinness 19'; Tanner 86'	Report	Redmond 14'	Stadium: Cardiff City Stadium

7 July 2023 Friendly	Cardiff City	1–1	Cambridge United	Leckwith
15:00 BST	Robinson 75'	Report	Ahadme 90'	Stadium: Cardiff City Stadium; Attendance: 0 (Behind-closed-doors)

11 July 2023 Friendly	Cardiff City	2–1	Bristol Rovers	Leckwith
15:00 BST	Robinson 45+1'; Tanner 49'	Report	Sinclair 13'	Stadium: Cardiff City Stadium; Attendance: 0 (Behind-closed-doors)

19 July 2023 Friendly	Braga	1–0	Cardiff City	Algarve, Portugal
19:00 WEST; 19:00 BST	Banza 40' (pen.)	Report

22 July 2023 Friendly	Porto	4–0	Cardiff City	Algarve, Portugal
19:00 WEST; 19:00 BST	Martínez 16', 45+1'; Taremi 50' (pen.); Navarro 76'	Report

29 July 2023 Joe Jacobson's Testimonial	Wycombe Wanderers	0–0	Cardiff City	High Wycombe
15:00 BST		Report		Stadium: Adams Park

== Competitions ==
=== Overall record ===
Competition	First match	Last match	Starting round	Final position	Record							
Competition	First match	Last match	Starting round	Final position	Pld	W	D	L	GF	GA	GD	Win %
Championship	6 August 2023	4 May 2024	Matchday 1	12th	46	19	5	22	53	70	−17	41.30
FA Cup	6 January 2024		Third round	Third round	1	0	0	1	0	4	−4	0.00
EFL Cup	9 August 2023	27 September 2023	First round	Third Round	3	1	1	1	7	8	−1	33.33
Total					50	20	6	24	60	82	−22	40.00

Last updated: 4 May 2024
Source: Soccerway

=== Championship ===
==== League table ====
Pos	Team	Pld	W	D	L	GF	GA	GD	Pts
9	Coventry City	46	17	13	16	70	59	+11	64
10	Preston North End	46	18	9	19	56	67	−11	63
11	Bristol City	46	17	11	18	53	51	+2	62
12	Cardiff City	46	19	5	22	53	70	−17	62
13	Millwall	46	16	11	19	45	55	−10	59
14	Swansea City	46	15	12	19	59	65	−6	57
15	Watford	46	13	17	16	61	61	0	56

Source: EFL official website
Rules for classification: 1) Points; 2) Goal difference; 3) Number of goals scored; 4) Head-to-head results; 5) Wins; 6) Away goals; 7) Penalty points (sec 9.5); 8) Number of 12-point sending off offences; 9) Play-off (only if needed to determine promotion/relegation)

==== Results summary ====
Overall								Home						Away					
Pld	W	D	L	GF	GA	GD	Pts	W	D	L	GF	GA	GD	W	D	L	GF	GA	GD
46	19	5	22	53	70	−17	62	10	3	10	27	32	−5	9	2	12	26	38	−12

Last updated: 4 May 2024.
Source: Soccerway

==== Results by round ====
Round	1	2	3	4	5	6	7	8	9	10	11	12	13	14	15	16	17	18	19	20	21	22	23	24	25	26	27	28	30	31	32	33	29^{1}	34	35	36	37	38	39	40	41	42	43	44	45	46
Ground	A	H	A	H	A	H	H	A	H	A	H	A	A	H	A	H	A	H	A	H	H	A	A	H	H	A	H	A	A	H	A	A	H	H	A	H	H	A	H	A	H	A	A	H	H	A
Result	D	L	L	W	L	W	W	W	W	L	D	L	W	W	D	L	W	L	L	W	L	L	W	D	L	W	L	L	W	L	L	L	D	W	W	W	W	L	L	W	L	W	L	W	L	L
Position	10	17	20	17	19	15	10	7	6	8	8	11	7	6	7	9	7	9	11	7	10	12	10	11	14	9	13	14	13	14	14	14	14	14	11	10	10	11	11	11	11	11	11	11	12	12

Updated to match(es) played on 4 May 2024. Source: Soccerway
A = Away; H = Home; W = Win; D = Draw; L = Loss
Notes:
- ^{1} Matchday 29 (vs Blackburn Rovers) was postponed due to Blackburn's FA Cup involvement.

==== Matches ====
On 22 June, the EFL Championship fixtures were released.

Win Draw Loss Fixtures

6 August 2023 1	Leeds United	2–2	Cardiff City	Leeds
14:30 BST	Cooper 49'; Ampadu (yellow card) 90+3'; Summerville 90+5' (yellow card) 90+6'	BBC Report; Sky Report	Bowler 23'; Ugbo 39'; Méïté (yellow card) 70'	Stadium: Elland Road; Attendance: 36,368; Referee: Josh Smith (Peterborough)
Note: Live on Sky Sports

12 August 2023 2	Cardiff City	1–2	Queens Park Rangers	Leckwith
15:00 BST	Adams (yellow card) 25'; Ugbo 78'; Bowler (yellow card) 83'	BBC Report; Sky report	Armstrong (yellow card) 27', (goal) 34'; Paal 65'; Adomah (yellow card) 90'	Stadium: Cardiff City Stadium; Attendance: 21,230; Referee: Oliver Langford (West Midlands)

19 August 2023 3	Leicester City	2–1	Cardiff City	Leicester
15:00 BST	Mavididi (yellow card) 5'; Marçal-Madivadua 36'; Casadei 90+2'	BBC Report; Sky report	Ramsey (yellow card) 19', (goal) 45+1'; Goutas (yellow card) 57'; Collins (yellow card) 87'; Simpson (yellow card) 90+1'; Romeo (yellow card) 90+4' (yellow-red card) 90+6'	Stadium: King Power Stadium; Attendance: 31,595; Referee: Graham Scott (Oxfordshire)

26 August 2023 4	Cardiff City	2–1	Sheffield Wednesday	Leckwith
15:00 BST	Ugbo 48'; Wintle 90+8' (pen.)	BBC Report; Sky report	Bannan (yellow card) 43', (goal) 76'; Bernard (yellow card) 66'; Delgado (yellow card) 80'; Paterson (yellow card) 90'; Windass (yellow card) 90+12'	Stadium: Cardiff City Stadium; Attendance: 21,058; Referee: Darren Bond (Lancashire)

2 September 2023 5	Ipswich Town	3–2	Cardiff City	Ipswich
15:00 BST	Clarke (yellow card) 33'; Broadhead 59', (yellow card) 90+6'; Burns (yellow card) 64'; Ladapo 68', 78'; Williams (yellow card) 90'	BBC Report; Sky report	Ramsey 30'; Tanner (yellow card) 38'; Ralls 52'; Ng (yellow card) 65'; Panzo (yellow card) 87'	Stadium: Portman Road; Attendance: 28,011; Referee: Gavin Ward (Surrey)

16 September 2023 6	Cardiff City	2–0	Swansea City	Leckwith
19:45 BST	Tanner 71', (yellow card) 81'; Ramsey 86' (pen.)	BBC report Sky report	Fulton (yellow card) 57'	Stadium: Cardiff City Stadium; Attendance: 28,648; Referee: Samuel Barrott (Yorkshire)
Note: Live on Sky TV

19 September 2023 7	Cardiff City	3–2	Coventry City	Leckwith
19:45 BST	Goutas 8'; Grant 61'; Collins (yellow card) 66'; Etete 84', (yellow card) 90+4'	BBC Report; Sky report	Godden 35', 90+6', (yellow card) 82'; Latibeaudiere (yellow card) 90'; McFadzean (yellow card) 90+9'	Stadium: Cardiff City Stadium; Attendance: 18,297; Referee: Sam Allison (Wiltshire)

24 September 2023 8	Sunderland	0–1	Cardiff City	Monkwearmouth
15:00 BST	Ba (yellow card) 9'; Burstow (yellow card) 58'	BBC report Sky report	Siopis (yellow card) 55'; Colwill (yellow card) 77'; McGuinness 87'	Stadium: Stadium of Light; Attendance: 41,581; Referee: Steve Martin (Staffordshire)

30 September 2023 9	Cardiff City	2–0	Rotherham United	Leckwith
15:00 BST	Siopis (yellow card) 35'; Goutas (yellow card) 45+1'; Etete 56'; Ng 90'	BBC report Sky report		Stadium: Cardiff City Stadium; Attendance: 20,136; Referee: Leigh Doughty (Lancashire)

3 October 2023 10	Middlesbrough	2–0	Cardiff City	Middlesbrough
19:45 BST	Jones 56'; Greenwood (yellow card) 75'; Latte Lath 84'	BBC report Sky report	Grant (yellow card) 32'; Ng (yellow card) 36'; Goutas (yellow card) 80'	Stadium: Riverside Stadium; Attendance: 24,276; Referee: Andy Madley (Huddersfield)

7 October 2023 11	Cardiff City	1–1	Watford	Leckwith
15:00 BST	McGuinness 26'	BBC report Sky report	Sierralta (yellow card) 39'; Bayo 54'; Lewis (yellow card) 65'	Stadium: Cardiff City Stadium; Attendance: 19,804; Referee: Gavin Ward (Surrey)

21 October 2023 12	Blackburn Rovers	1–0	Cardiff City	Blackburn
15:00 BST	Rankin-Costello 53'	BBC report Sky report		Stadium: Ewood Park; Attendance: 13,572; Referee: Bobby Madley (Yorkshire)

24 October 2023 13	Huddersfield Town	0–4	Cardiff City	Huddersfield
19:45 BST		BBC report Sky report	Robinson 2'; Goutas 12'; Meite 43'; Ng 55'	Stadium: John Smith's Stadium; Attendance: 16,780; Referee: Anthony Backhouse (Cumbria)

28 October 2023 14	Cardiff City	2–0	Bristol City	Leckwith
15:00 BST	Ng 33'; Colwill 90+1'	BBC report Sky report		Stadium: Cardiff City Stadium; Attendance: 25,803; Referee: Darren England (Barnsley)

4 November 2023 15	Stoke City	0–0	Cardiff City	Stoke-on-Trent
15:00 GMT		BBC report Sky report		Stadium: Bet365 Stadium; Attendance: 23,089; Referee: Oliver Langford (West Midlands)

11 November 2023 16	Cardiff City	2–3	Norwich City	Leckwith
15:00 GMT	Grant (yellow card) 12'; Bowler 39'; Robinson 43'; Wintle (yellow card) 79'	BBC report Sky report	Fassnacht 22'; Núñez (yellow card) 45'; Gibbs (yellow card) 77'; Wintle 82' (o.g.); Idah 84'	Stadium: Cardiff City Stadium; Attendance: 21,271; Referee: Rebecca Welch (Tyneside)

25 November 2023 17	Preston North End	1–2	Cardiff City	Preston
15:00 GMT	Evans (yellow card) 31'; Best (yellow card) 47'; Osmajić 48'; Brady (yellow card) 31' (yellow-red card) 52'; Woodman (yellow card) 77'	BBC report Sky report	Collins (yellow card) 30'; Grant 90+6'; Ugbo 90+9'	Stadium: Deepdale; Attendance: 14,593; Referee: Bobby Madley (Yorkshire)

28 November 2023 18	Cardiff City	0–1	West Bromwich Albion	Leckwith
19:45 GMT		BBC report Sky report	Sarmiento 50'	Stadium: Cardiff City Stadium; Attendance: 18,248; Referee: Josh Smith (Peterborough)

2 December 2023 19	Southampton	2–0	Cardiff City	Southampton
15:00 GMT	A Armstrong 11', 15'	BBC report Sky report		Stadium: St Mary's Stadium; Attendance: 28,659; Referee: James Bell (South Yorkshire)

9 December 2023 20	Cardiff City	1–0	Millwall	Leckwith
15:00 GMT	Méïté (yellow card) 62'; Goutas 78'	BBC report Sky report	Hutchinson (yellow card) 63'; Leonard (yellow card) 79'	Stadium: Cardiff City Stadium; Attendance: 19,426; Referee: Andrew Kitchen (Durham)

13 December 2023 21	Cardiff City	0–1	Birmingham City	Leckwith
19:45 GMT	Méïté (yellow card) 55'	BBC report Sky report	Šunjić (yellow card) 42'; Bacuna 45+3'; Dembélé (yellow card) 63'	Stadium: Cardiff City Stadium; Attendance: 17,669; Referee: Steve Martin (Staffordshire)

16 December 2023 22	Hull City	3–0	Cardiff City	Kingston upon Hull
15:00 GMT	Connolly 32'; Twine 56'; Tufan 59'	BBC report Sky report		Stadium: KCOM Stadium; Attendance: 20,352; Referee: Keith Stroud (Hampshire)

23 December 2023 23	Sheffield Wednesday	1–2	Cardiff City	Owlerton, Sheffield
15:00 GMT	Musaba 28'	BBC report Sky report	Grant 74'; Famewo 88' (o.g.)	Stadium: Hillsborough; Attendance: 26,009; Referee: Samuel Barrott (Yorkshire)

26 December 2023 24	Cardiff City	2–2	Plymouth Argyle	Cardiff
15:00 GMT	Butcher 31' (o.g.); Grant 47'	BBC report Sky report	Whittaker 18', 66'	Stadium: Cardiff City Stadium; Attendance: 23,583; Referee: Andy Davies

29 December 2023 25	Cardiff City	0–2	Leicester City	Leckwith
19:45 GMT		BBC report Sky report	Desbury-Hall 18'; Justin 55'	Stadium: Cardiff City Stadium; Attendance: 24,656; Referee: John Busby (Oxfordshire)

1 January 2024 26	Queens Park Rangers	1–2	Cardiff City	Shepherd's Bush
15:00 GMT	Smyth 52'	BBC report Sky report	Goutas 16'; Ng 74'	Stadium: Loftus Road; Attendance: 16,849; Referee: Andrew Kitchen (Durham)

13 January 2024 27	Cardiff City	0–3	Leeds United	Leckwith
15:00 GMT		BBC report Sky report	Bamford 13'; James 31'; Summerville (penalty missed) 79'; Rutter 88'	Stadium: Cardiff City Stadium; Attendance: 25,991; Referee: Oliver Langford (West Midlands)

20 January 2024 28	Plymouth Argyle	3–1	Cardiff City	Plymouth
15:00 GMT	Hardie 31', 52'; Whittaker 81'	BBC report Sky report	Ng 10'	Stadium: Home Park; Attendance: 16.471; Referee: Steve Martin (Staffordshire)

3 February 2024 30	Watford	0–1	Cardiff City	Watford
15:00 GMT	Chakvetadze (yellow card) 44'; Pollock (yellow card) 47'; Livermore (yellow card) 50'	BBC report Sky report	Bowler 41', (yellow card) 69'; Colwill (yellow card) 51'; Goutas (yellow card) 91'	Stadium: Vicarage Road; Attendance: 19,739; Referee: John Busby (Oxfordshire)

10 February 2024 31	Cardiff City	0–2	Preston North End	Leckwith
15:00 GMT	Alnwick (yellow card) 41'; Méïté (yellow card) 90'	BBC report Sky report	Riis Jakobsen 31'; Whiteman 40'; Frøkjær-Jensen (yellow card) 74'	Stadium: Cardiff City Stadium; Attendance: 18,763; Referee: Dean Whitestone (Northampton)

13 February 2024 32	West Bromwich Albion	2–0	Cardiff City	West Bromwich
20:00 GMT	Johnston 1'; Weimann 80'	BBC report Sky report		Stadium: The Hawthorns; Attendance: 23,541; Referee: Rebecca Welch (Tyneside)

17 February 2024 33	Norwich City	4–1	Cardiff City	Norwich
15:00 GMT	Sargent 39', 54'; Gomes Sara 44'; Fassnacht 77'	BBC report Sky report	Collins 19'	Stadium: Carrow Road; Attendance: 25,902; Referee: Darren Bond (Lancashire)

20 February 2024 29	Cardiff City	0–0	Blackburn Rovers	Leckwith
19:45 GMT		BBC report Sky report		Stadium: Cardiff City Stadium; Attendance: 17,131; Referee: Leigh Doughty (Lancashire)
Note: Fixture was originally scheduled for 27 January, but was postponed due to Blackburn's FA Cup involvement.

24 February 2024 34	Cardiff City	2–1	Stoke City	Leckwith
15:00 GMT	Etete 5'; Karlan 32'; Ng (yellow card) 40'; Siopis (yellow card) 51'; Ralls (yellow card) 76'; Goutas (yellow card) 83'	BBC report Sky report	Bae Jun-ho 41'; Thompson (yellow card) 47'; Burger (yellow card) 73'	Stadium: Cardiff City Stadium; Attendance: 18,976; Referee: Anthony Backhouse (Cumbria)

2 March 2024 35	Bristol City	0–1	Cardiff City	Bristol
12:30 GMT	King (yellow card) 48'; Gardner-Hickman (yellow card) 76'	BBC report Sky report EFL report	Etete (yellow card) 15'; Ng 66'; Wilson-Esbrand (yellow card) 67'	Stadium: Ashton Gate Stadium; Attendance: 24,035; Referee: Sam Allison

6 March 2024 36	Cardiff City	1–0	Huddersfield Town	Leckwith
19:45 GMT	Wintle (yellow card) 27'; Diédhiou 30'; Grant (yellow card) 59'; Ng (yellow card) 66'; Tanner (yellow card) 83'	BBC report Sky report	Spencer (yellow card) 19'	Stadium: Cardiff City Stadium; Attendance: 17,243; Referee: Matt Donohue (Manchester)

9 March 2024 37	Cardiff City	2–1	Ipswich Town	Leckwith
12:30 GMT	Wintle 90+5'; O'Dowda 90+10'	BBC report Sky report	Moore 79'	Stadium: Cardiff City Stadium; Attendance: 21,771; Referee: Oliver Langford (West Midlands)
Note: Live on Sky TV

16 March 2024 38	Swansea City	2–0	Cardiff City	Swansea
12:30 GMT	Darling (yellow card) 17'; Allen (yellow card) 21'; Cullen 34', (penalty missed) 51'; Lowe 90+6'	BBC report Sky report EFL report	Méïté (yellow card) 17'	Stadium: Swansea.com Stadium; Attendance: 20,005; Referee: David Webb (County Durham)
Note: Live on Sky TV

29 March 2024 39	Cardiff City	0–2	Sunderland	Leckwith
15:00 GMT	Wintle (yellow card) 64'; Bowler (yellow card) 64'	BBC report Sky report	Aouchiche 12' (pen.); Bellingham 27'; Styles (yellow card) 36'	Stadium: Cardiff City Stadium; Attendance: 22,141; Referee: Jeremy Simpson (Lancashire)

1 April 2024 40	Coventry City	1–2	Cardiff City	Coventry
15:00 BST	Simms 22'	BBC report Sky report	Kitching 29', 67' (o.g.)	Stadium: Coventry Building Society Arena; Attendance: 28,529; Referee: Leigh Doughty (Lancashire)

6 April 2024 41	Cardiff City	1–3	Hull City	Leckwith
15:00 BST	Grant 57'	BBC report Sky report	Carvalho 32', 44'; Philogene 59'	Stadium: Cardiff City Stadium; Attendance: 20,688; Referee: John Busby (Oxfordshire)

10 April 2024 42	Birmingham City	0–1	Cardiff City	Birmingham
19:45 BST		BBC report Sky report	Bowler 65'	Stadium: St Andrews Stadium; Attendance: 20,894; Referee: Sam Allison (Wiltshire)

13 April 2024 43	Millwall	3–1	Cardiff City	Bermondsey
15:00 BST	Obafemi 9'; Cooper 49'; Longman (yellow card) 69'; Saville (yellow card) 91'; Watmore 93', (yellow card) 94'	BBC report Sky report	Méïté 24'; Collins (yellow card) 69'	Stadium: The Den; Attendance: 17,151; Referee: Will Finnie (Bedfordshire)

20 April 2024 44	Cardiff City	2–1	Southampton	Leckwith
15:00 BST	Diédhiou 68'; Phillips (yellow card) 82'; Ashford 90+6'	BBC report Sky report	Aribo 12'; S. Armstrong (yellow card) 43'; Sulemana (yellow card) 81'; Bednarek (yellow card) 90+1'	Stadium: Cardiff City Stadium; Attendance: 22,372; Referee: Oliver Langford (West Midlands)

27 April 2024 45	Cardiff City	1–4	Middlesbrough	Leckwith
15:00 BST	Bowler 90+1'	BBC report Sky report	Clarke 45'; Azaz 49'; Lathe Lath 56'; Gilbert 60'	Stadium: Cardiff City Stadium; Attendance: 22,999; Referee: Jeremy Simpson (Lancashire)

4 May 2024 46	Rotherham United	5–2	Cardiff City	Rotherham
12:30 BST	Hugill 25', 69'; Eaves 45+2', 57' (pen.); Nombe 63'	BBC report Sky report	Phillips 38'; Tanner 47'	Stadium: AESSEAL New York Stadium; Referee: Andy Davies

=== FA Cup ===
Cardiff entered the competition in the third round, as a Championship club, and were drawn away to Sheffield Wednesday.

Win Draw Loss Fixtures

6 January 2024 Third Round	Sheffield Wednesday	4–0	Cardiff City	Owlerton, Sheffield
17:30 GMT	Windass 2'; Sawyers 38' (o.g.); Palmer 40'; Wilks 90+1'	BBC report Sky report		Stadium: Hillsborough; Attendance: 10,955; Referee: Thomas Kirk (Manchester)

=== EFL Cup ===
Cardiff were drawn at home to Colchester United in the first round, and then away to Birmingham City in the second round and Blackburn Rovers in the third round.

Win Draw Loss Fixtures

9 August 2023 First round	Cardiff City	2–2 (3–0 p)	Colchester United	Leckwith
19:45 BST	Colwill 19', (yellow card) 78'; Etete 35'	BBC Sport	Akinde 40'; Taylor 44'; Tovide (red card) 89'; Greenidge (yellow card) 90+7'	Stadium: Cardiff City Stadium; Attendance: 5,158; Referee: Will Finnie
	Penalties
	Colwill (penalty missed); Romeo (penalty scored); Ojo (penalty scored); Ugbo (penalty scored)		Fevrier (penalty missed); Tchamadeu (penalty missed); Hopper (penalty missed)

29 August 2023 Second round	Birmingham City	1–3	Cardiff City	Bordesley
19:45 BST	Oakley (yellow card) 35'; Jutkiewicz (red card) 56'; Hogan 70'; Cosgrove (yellow card) 76'	BBC Report; Sky report	Colwill 3'; Rinomhota (yellow card) 23'; Etete (yellow card) 50', (goal) 90+4'; Wintle 68'; Romeo (yellow card) 90+3'	Stadium: St Andrew's Stadium; Referee: Leigh Doughty (Blackpool)

27 September 2023 Third round	Blackburn Rovers	5–2	Cardiff City	Blackburn
19:45 BST	Garrett 13'; Sigurðsson 36'; Moran 49', 54'; Markanday 69'	BBC report Sky report	Robinson 18'; Etete 45+3'	Stadium: Ewood Park; Attendance: 5,371; Referee: Andrew Kitchen

=== Welsh League Cup ===
Cardiff were drawn away against Cambrian & Clydach Vale in the first round.

Win Draw Loss Fixtures

21 July 2023 First round	Cambrian & Clydach Vale	2–2 (3–4 p)	Cardiff City Under 21	Clydach Vale
19:30 BST	Parker 6'; Morgan 90+1'	Report	K. Jones 33' (o.g.); Ashford 44'	Stadium: King George's New Field; Referee: Alex McInch
	Penalties
	Spencer (penalty missed); Thomas (penalty scored); Morgan (penalty scored); Keetch (penalty scored); Parker (penalty missed); Caffell (penalty missed)		Crole (penalty missed); Ashford (penalty scored); Wigley (penalty missed); Lawlor (penalty scored); Hughes (penalty scored); Spiers (penalty scored)

6 August 2023 Second round	Haverfordwest County	0–4	Cardiff City Under 21	Haverfordwest
14:30 BST		Club report	Ashford 7', 26', 47', 65'	Stadium: Bridge Meadow Stadium; Referee: Benjamin Williams

19 September 2023 Third round	Swansea City	1–1 (5-3 p)	Cardiff City Under 21	Swansea
19:30 BST	Cadogan 25'	Cymru Football report	Evans 71'	Stadium: Swansea.com Stadium; Referee: Bryn Markham-Jones
	Penalties
	Congreve (penalty scored); Parker (penalty scored); Cadogan (penalty scored); Jenkins (penalty scored); Fletcher (penalty scored)		Crole (penalty scored); Johnson (penalty missed); Ashford (penalty scored); Giles (penalty scored)
