= Jack Simpson (footballer) =

English footballer (born 1996)

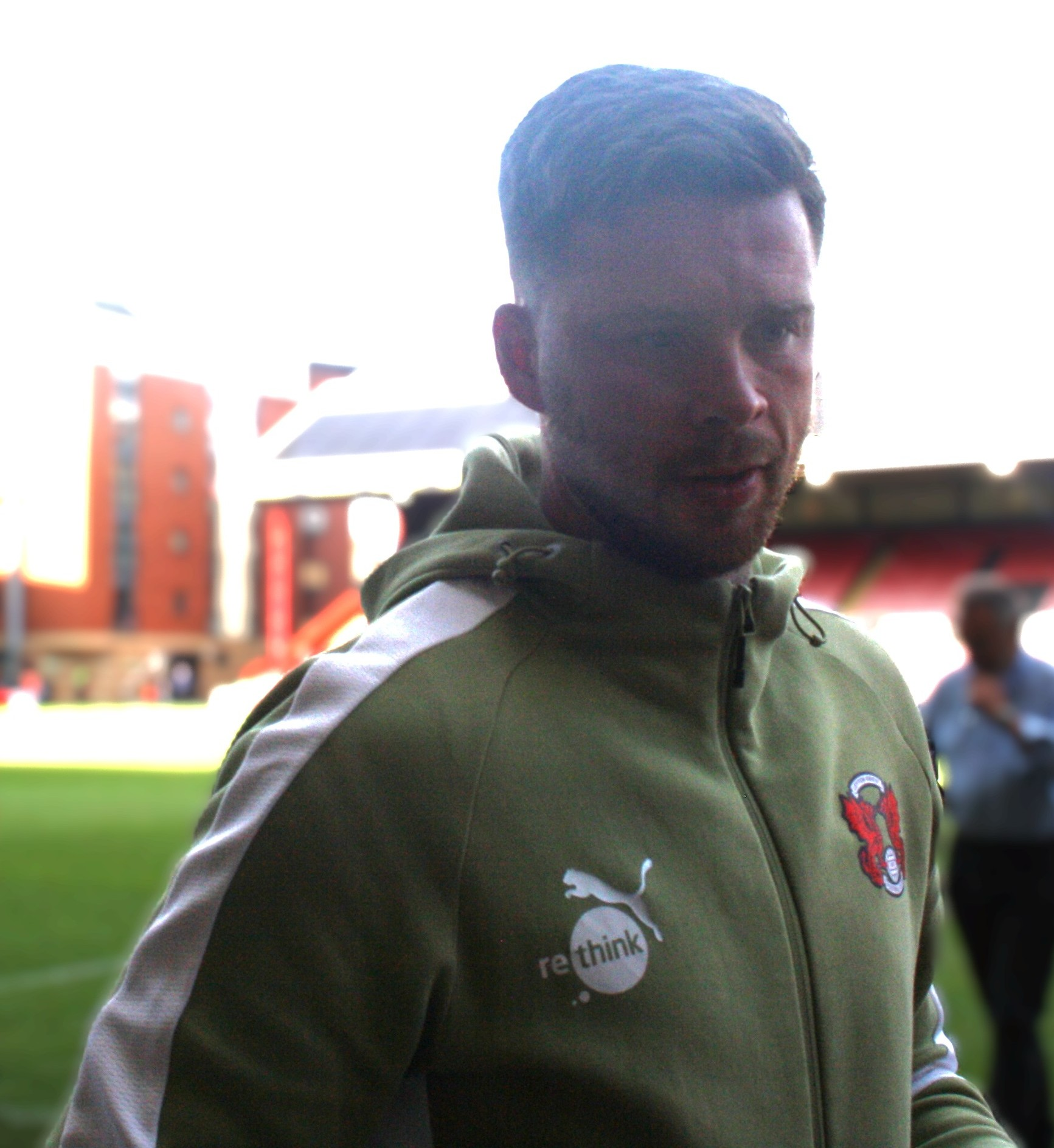
- Simpson with Leyton Orient in 2025

Personal information
- Full name: Jack Benjamin Simpson
- Date of birth: 18 December 1996 (age 29)
- Place of birth: Weymouth, England
- Height: 1.90 m (6 ft 3 in)
- Position: Centre-back

Team information
- Current team: Chesterfield
- Number: 6

Youth career
- 2005–2015: AFC Bournemouth

Senior career*
Years	Team	Apps	(Gls)
2015–2021	AFC Bournemouth	20	(0)
2015	→ AFC Totton (loan)	13	(2)
2021–2022	Rangers	9	(0)
2022–2023	Cardiff City	20	(0)
2024–2026	Leyton Orient	57	(2)
2026–	Chesterfield	5	(0)

International career
2018	England U21	1	(0)
- * Club domestic league appearances and goals as of 19:36, 10 September 2026 (UTC)

Jack Benjamin Simpson (born 18 December 1996) is an English professional footballer who plays as a centre-back for EFL League Two club Chesterfield.

He began his career at AFC Bournemouth, where he made 35 appearances, including 11 in the Premier League, and scored one goal. In January 2021, he joined Rangers, where he won a Scottish Premiership title. For a year from August 2022 he represented Cardiff City, of which he left with mutual consent. In February 2024, he joined Leyton Orient on a free transfer until the end of the season, with an option to extend in June 2024.

== Club career ==
=== AFC Bournemouth ===
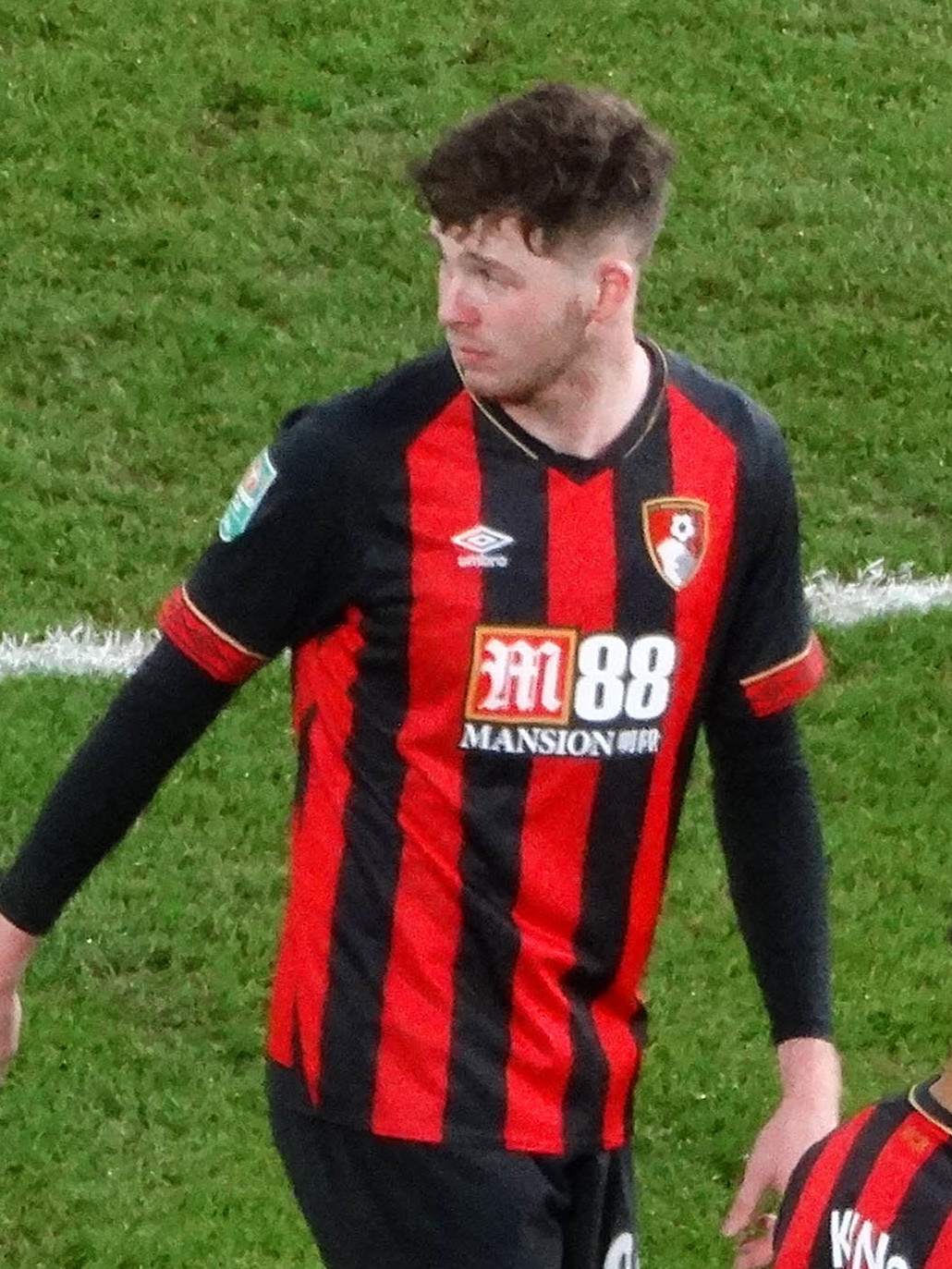
Simpson with AFC Bournemouth in 2018.

Simpson joined AFC Bournemouth at the age of twelve and signed his first professional contract in April 2015. Following this, he had a brief loan spell at non-League club AFC Totton during the early stages of the 2015–16 campaign before returning to Bournemouth and appearing as a substitute in their FA Cup fourth round tie against Portsmouth.

On 24 October 2017, almost two years after first appearing in a Bournemouth matchday squad, Simpson made his first-team debut in an EFL Cup tie against Middlesbrough, scoring the opening goal in their 3–1 victory. He made his Premier League debut on 23 December, starting in a 4–0 loss away to Manchester City.

=== Rangers ===
On 28 January 2021, Simpson signed a pre-contract agreement to join Scottish Premiership club Rangers following the expiry of his Bournemouth contract at the end of the 2020–21 season. A deal was then made with Bournemouth that allowed Simpson to move permanently on 1 February; the Cherries were granted a sell-on fee and Simpson joined on a free transfer. He made his debut against Dundee United on 21 February, coming for Filip Helander as a 67th-minute substitute. He finished his first half-season as a league champion.

=== Cardiff City ===
Simpson moved to Cardiff City for an undisclosed transfer fee in August 2022, signing a two-year deal. It was later revealed that Simpson had joined the club on a free transfer, with Rangers due performance dependent add-ons.

On 31 August 2023, Simpson departed from Cardiff through mutual consent. On 3 October he was charged by the Football Association with using racially abusive language to a teammate on a pre-season tour of Portugal. The following month, he was banned for six games and fined £8,000. The Regulatory Commission's written reasons detailed that Simpson had made a discriminatory comment to Rohan Luthra, a British Asian, which was witnessed by Rubin Colwill and Kieron Evans. Luthra did not report the incident until he saw an FA presentation about reporting discrimination. Simpson, who according to Evans instantly regretted his slur due to his own girlfriend being of Indian heritage, said in his hearing that he did not recall the event due to intoxication but accepted that he must have made the comment.

=== Leyton Orient ===
On 29 February 2024, Simpson signed for League One club Leyton Orient on a contract until the end of the 2023–24 season with a view to extend the deal in the summer. On 21 May 2024, the club announced he had signed a year-long extension. On 7 May 2026, the club said it was releasing the player.

=== Chesterfield ===
On 2 July 2026, Simpson joined League Two club Chesterfield on a two-year deal.

== International career ==
Simpson was part of the England national team youth sides during the early part of his career and made an appearance for the under-21 side in November 2018. He played the full ninety minutes in defence, during a 5–1 away win against Denmark under-21s.

== Career statistics ==
As of end of 2025–26 season

Appearances and goals by club, season and competition
Club	Season	League			National cup (Note: Includes FA Cup, Scottish Cup)		League cup (Note: Includes EFL Cup, Scottish League Cup)		Other		Total	
Club	Season	Division	Apps	Goals	Apps	Goals	Apps	Goals	Apps	Goals	Apps	Goals
AFC Bournemouth	2015–16	Premier League	0	0	0	0	0	0	—		0	0
AFC Bournemouth	2016–17	Premier League	0	0	0	0	0	0	—		0	0
AFC Bournemouth	2017–18	Premier League	1	0	1	0	2	1	—		4	1
AFC Bournemouth	2018–19	Premier League	6	0	1	0	4	0	—		11	0
AFC Bournemouth	2019–20	Premier League	4	0	2	0	2	0	—		8	0
AFC Bournemouth	2020–21	Championship	9	0	1	0	2	0	—		12	0
AFC Bournemouth	Total		20	0	5	0	10	1	—		35	1
AFC Totton (loan)	2015–16	Southern League D1 S&W	13	2	0	0	—		0	0	13	2
Rangers	2020–21	Scottish Premiership	5	0	1	0	0	0	1	0	7	0
Rangers	2021–22	Scottish Premiership	4	0	2	0	1	0	0	0	7	0
Rangers	Total		9	0	3	0	1	0	1	0	14	0
Cardiff City	2022–23	Championship	19	0	2	0	0	0	—		21	0
Cardiff City	2023–24	Championship	1	0	0	0	1	0	—		2	0
Cardiff City	Total		20	0	2	0	1	0	—		23	0
Leyton Orient	2023–24	League One	5	0	0	0	0	0	0	0	5	0
Leyton Orient	2024–25	League One	17	0	4	0	1	0	4 (Note: Appearance(s) in EFL Trophy)	0	26	0
Leyton Orient	2025–26	League One	35	2	1	0	1	0	4	0	41	2
Leyton Orient	Total		57	2	5	0	2	0	8	0	72	2
Career total			119	4	15	0	14	1	9	0	157	5

== Honours ==
Rangers

- Scottish Premiership: 2020–21
