= Rohan Luthra =

English footballer

Personal information
- Full name: Rohan Vir Luthra
- Date of birth: 6 May 2002 (age 24)
- Place of birth: England
- Position: Goalkeeper

Team information
- Current team: Gillingham
- Number: 40

Youth career
- 2010–2020: Crystal Palace

Senior career*
Years	Team	Apps	(Gls)
2020–2021	Crystal Palace	0	(0)
2020	→ South Park (loan)	6	(0)
2021–2024	Cardiff City	1	(0)
2023	→ Slough Town (loan)	12	(0)
2024–2025	Derby County	0	(0)
2025	→ Spennymoor Town (loan)	3	(0)
2026	Bedford Town	5	(0)
2026	Eastbourne Borough	7	(0)
2026-	Gillingham	0	(0)
- * Club domestic league appearances and goals as of 20:06, 29 September 2026 (UTC)

Rohan Vir Luthra (born 6 May 2002) is an English professional footballer who plays as a goalkeeper for Gillingham.

He started his career at Crystal Palace, with a loan spell at South Park, after this he joined Cardiff City, where he had a spell at Slough Town. Luthra then joined Derby County where he had a loan spell at Spennymoor Town.

== Club career ==
Luthra joined the youth academy of Crystal Palace in 2010, and debuted with their U18s at the age of 15. On 2 June 2020, he signed his first professional contract with Crystal Palace. On 20 October 2020, he joined non-league club South Park on loan. On 22 June 2021, he moved to the youth academy of Cardiff City. On May June 2022, he extended the contract with Cardiff City. On 11 March 2023, he made his professional debut with Cardiff City as a late substitute in a 2–0 EFL Championship loss to Preston North End. In doing so he became the first goalkeeper of South Asian descent to play in the Championship. On 24 August 2023, Luthra joined National League South side Slough Town on loan until the end of the season.

In July 2023, on a pre-season tour of Portugal, Luthra was racially abused by teammate Jack Simpson, who left Cardiff by mutual consent a month later. Simpson was fined £8,000 and banned for six games by the Football Association after a hearing in November.

At the end of the 2023–24 season, Luthra was released by Cardiff at the expiry of his contract in June 2024.

In July 2024, Luthra went on trial at Derby County. On 7 August 2024, he signed a one year contract. On 1 April 2025, Luthra joined Spennymoor Town on an emergency loan, making his debut for the National League North side on the same day. He helped his side reach the FA Trophy final, after a penalty shootout victory over Rochdale.

On 16 May 2025; it was announced by Derby County that Luthra would leave Derby County upon the expiry of his contract in June 2025.

On 27 January 2026, Luthra signed for National League North side Bedford Town.

On 26 February 2026, Luthra joined National League South side Eastbourne Borough.

In September 2026, Luthra joined Gillingham.

== International career ==
Born in England, Luthra is of Punjabi Indian descent. He was called up to represent the England U15s.

== Personal life ==
Outside of football, Luthra played cricket with the Sunbury Cricket Club since the age of 6. Starting as a wicket-keeper, he developed into an aggressive left-handed batsman. He left the club to focus on football after he was offered a scholarship by Crystal Palace.

== Career statistics ==
As of match played 3 April 2026

Appearances and goals by club, season and competition
Club	Season	League			FA Cup		EFL Cup		Other		Total	
Club	Season	Division	Apps	Goals	Apps	Goals	Apps	Goals	Apps	Goals	Apps	Goals
Crystal Palace	2020–21	Premier League	0	0	0	0	0	0	0	0	0	0
South Park (loan)	2020–21	Isthmian South Central Division	6	0	—		—		0	0	6	0
Cardiff City	2021–22	Championship	0	0	0	0	0	0	0	0	0	0
Cardiff City	2022–23	Championship	1	0	0	0	0	0	0	0	1	0
Cardiff City	2023–24	Championship	0	0	0	0	0	0	0	0	0	0
Cardiff City	Total		1	0	0	0	0	0	0	0	1	0
Slough Town (loan)	2023–24	National League South	12	0	2	0	0	0	0	0	14	0
Derby County	2024–25	Championship	0	0	0	0	0	0	0	0	0	0
Spennymoor Town (loan)	2024–25	National League North	3	0	0	0	0	0	0	0	3	0
Bedford Town	2025–26	National League North	5	0	0	0	0	0	0	0	5	0
Eastbourne Borough	2025–26	National League South	7	0	0	0	0	0	0	0	7	0
Career total			34	0	2	0	0	0	0	0	36	0
