= 2022–23 Cardiff City F.C. season =

Welsh football club season

Cardiff City FC
2022–23 season
- Owner: Vincent Tan
- Chairman: Mehmet Dalman
- Manager: Steve Morison (until 18 September); Mark Hudson (from 14 November until 14 January); Sabri Lamouchi (from 27 January)
- Stadium: Cardiff City Stadium
- Championship: 21st
- FA Cup: Third round
- EFL Cup: First round
- Top goalscorer: League: Sory Kaba (8); All: Sory Kaba (8)
- Highest home attendance: 28,232 vs. Swansea City, 1 April 2023
- Lowest home attendance: 6,303 vs. Portsmouth, 9 August 2022
- Average home league attendance: 19,455
- Biggest win: 3–1 vs. Wigan Athletic (8 October 2022), 3-1 vs. Blackpool F.C (7 April 2023), 3-1 vs. Watford F.C (19 April 2023)
- Biggest defeat: 0–3 vs. Portsmouth (9 August 2022), 0–3 vs. Burnley (8 May 2023)
Home colours	Away colours	Third colours

The 2022–23 season was the 124th season in the existence of Cardiff City Football Club and the club's fourth consecutive season in the Championship. In addition to the league, they also competed in the 2022–23 FA Cup and the 2022–23 EFL Cup.

The Bluebirds finished the season with 49 points. This ultimately proved enough to secure them 21st place and preserve their Championship status, albeit only on account of relegation rivals Reading being assessed a six-point deduction.

== First-team squad ==
As of 14 February 2023

Note: Flags indicate national team as has been defined under FIFA eligibility rules. Players may hold more than one non-FIFA nationality.

No.	Name	Nat.	Position(s)	Date of birth (age)	Apps.	Goals	Year signed	Signed from	Transfer fee	Ends
Goalkeepers
1	Ryan Allsop	(England)	GK	17 June 1992 (age 34)	43	0	2022	(England) Derby County	Free	2024
21	Jak Alnwick	(England)	GK	17 June 1993 (age 33)	7	0	2022	(Scotland) St Mirren	Free	2024
28	Rohan Luthra	(England)	GK	6 May 2002 (age 24)	1	0	2021	(England) Crystal Palace	Free	2024
Defenders
2	Mahlon Romeo	(Antigua and Barbuda) (England)	RB/RM	19 September 1995 (age 31)	33	0	2022	(England) Millwall	Undisclosed	2025
3	Joel Bagan	(Republic of Ireland) (England) (Scotland)	LB	3 September 2001 (age 25)	41	3	2020	Academy	Trainee	2023
5	Mark McGuinness	(Republic of Ireland) (England)	CB	5 January 2001 (age 25)	54	3	2021	(England) Arsenal	Undisclosed	2024
15	Oliver Denham	(Wales) (England)	CB/RB	4 May 2002 (age 24)	8	0	2021	(England) Manchester United	Trainee	2024
17	Jamilu Collins	(Nigeria)	LB/CB/LM	5 August 1994 (age 32)	4	0	2022	(Germany) SC Paderborn	Free	2024
22	Vontae Daley-Campbell	(England)	RB	2 April 2001 (age 25)	2	0	2022	(England) Leicester City	Free	2025
23	Cédric Kipré	(Ivory Coast) (France)	CB	9 December 1996 (age 29)	43	3	2022	(England) West Bromwich Albion	Loan	2023
26	Jack Simpson	(England)	CB/LB	18 December 1996 (age 29)	21	0	2022	(Scotland) Rangers	Undisclosed	2024
38	Perry Ng	(England) (Singapore)	RB/LB/CB	27 April 1996 (age 30)	105	2	2021	(England) Crewe Alexandra	£350,000	2024
Midfielders
6	Ryan Wintle	(England)	DM/CM/CB	13 June 1997 (age 29)	73	2	2021	(England) Crewe Alexandra	Free	2024
8	Joe Ralls	(England)	CM/LM/DM	12 October 1993 (age 33)	351	33	2011	Academy	Trainee	2024
11	Callum O'Dowda	(Republic of Ireland) (England)	LW/AM/RW/LWB	23 April 1995 (age 31)	40	3	2022	(England) Bristol City	Free	2025
12	Tom Sang	(England)	AM/RW/RB	29 June 1999 (age 27)	27	0	2020	(England) Manchester United	Free	2023
18	Ebou Adams	(The Gambia) (England)	CM/DM/AM	15 January 1996 (age 30)	0	0	2022	(England) Forest Green Rovers	Free	2025
19	Romaine Sawyers	(Saint Kitts and Nevis) (England)	AM/CM/SS	2 November 1991 (age 35)	39	3	2022	(England) West Bromwich Albion	Free	2024
20	Gavin Whyte	(Northern Ireland)	RW/LW	31 January 1996 (age 30)	53	2	2019	(England) Oxford United	£2,000,000	2023
24	Eli King	(Wales)	CM	23 December 2002 (age 23)	7	0	2021	Academy	Trainee	2023
25	Jaden Philogene	(England)	LW/RW	8 February 2002 (age 24)	39	5	2022	(England) Aston Villa	Loan	2023
27	Rubin Colwill	(Wales)	AM/LW/RW	27 April 2002 (age 24)	66	6	2020	Academy	Trainee	2024
35	Andy Rinomhota	(England)	CM/DM/RM	21 April 1997 (age 29)	41	0	2022	(England) Reading	Free	2025
Forwards
9	Kion Etete	(England) (Nigeria)	CF/SS	28 November 2001 (age 24)	30	3	2022	(England) Tottenham Hotspur	£500,000	2025
10	Sheyi Ojo	(England)	LW/RW/SS	19 June 1997 (age 29)	80	7	2022	(England) Liverpool	Free	2024
29	Mark Harris	(Wales)	CF/LW/RW	29 December 1998 (age 27)	94	10	2017	Academy	Trainee	2023
31	Connor Wickham	(England)	CF/LW	31 March 1993 (age 33)	12	1	2023	Free Agent	Free	2023
39	Isaak Davies	(Wales)	SS/RW/LW	25 September 2001 (age 25)	42	4	2020	Academy	Trainee	2025
47	Callum Robinson	(Republic of Ireland)	LW/CF/RW	2 February 1995 (age 31)	23	7	2022	(England) West Bromwich Albion	£1,500,000	2025
48	Sory Kaba	(Guinea)	CF	28 June 1995 (age 31)	17	8	2023	(Denmark) Midtjylland	Loan	2023
Out on Loan
14	Ollie Tanner	(England)	LW/AM/RW	13 May 2002 (age 24)	2	0	2022	(England) Lewes	£50,000	2024
36	Max Watters	(England)	CF	23 March 1999 (age 27)	22	1	2021	(England) Crawley Town	Undisclosed	2024
	Dillon Phillips	(England)	GK	11 June 1995 (age 31)	36	0	2020	(England) Charlton Athletic	Undisclosed	2023

== Statistics ==
As of 8 May 2023
Players with names in italics and marked * were on loan from another club for the whole of their season with Cardiff City.

No.	Pos	Nat	Player	Total		Championship		FA Cup		EFL Cup	
No.	Pos	Nat	Player	Apps	Goals	Apps	Goals	Apps	Goals	Apps	Goals
1	GK	(England) ENG	Ryan Allsop	43	0	43+0	0	0+0	0	0+0	0
2	DF	(Antigua and Barbuda) ANT	Mahlon Romeo	33	0	31+2	0	0+0	0	0+0	0
3	DF	(Republic of Ireland) IRL	Joel Bagan	4	0	1+0	0	2+0	0	1+0	0
5	DF	(Republic of Ireland) IRL	Mark McGuinness	19	0	19+0	0	0+0	0	0+0	0
6	MF	(England) ENG	Ryan Wintle	47	2	44+1	2	0+2	0	0+0	0
8	MF	(England) ENG	Joe Ralls	43	1	30+11	1	0+1	0	1+0	0
9	FW	(England) ENG	Kion Etete	30	3	12+16	3	1+0	0	0+1	0
10	FW	(England) ENG	Sheyi Ojo	39	2	24+12	1	2+0	1	0+1	0
11	MF	(Republic of Ireland) IRL	Callum O'Dowda	40	3	36+3	3	0+1	0	0+0	0
12	MF	(England) ENG	Tom Sang	11	0	4+5	0	2+0	0	0+0	0
15	DF	(Wales) WAL	Oliver Denham	1	0	0+0	0	0+0	0	1+0	0
17	DF	(Nigeria) NGR	Jamilu Collins	4	0	4+0	0	0+0	0	0+0	0
19	MF	(Saint Kitts and Nevis) SKN	Romaine Sawyers	39	3	22+15	3	2+0	0	0+0	0
20	MF	(Northern Ireland) NIR	Gavin Whyte	15	1	3+10	1	0+1	0	1+0	0
21	GK	(England) ENG	Jak Alnwick	7	0	3+1	0	2+0	0	1+0	0
22	DF	(England) ENG	Vontae Daley-Campbell	2	0	1+0	0	0+0	0	1+0	0
23	DF	(Ivory Coast) CIV	Cédric Kipré*	43	3	41+1	3	0+1	0	0+0	0
24	MF	(Wales) WAL	Eli King	2	0	0+1	0	0+0	0	1+0	0
25	MF	(England) ENG	Jaden Philogene*	39	5	25+12	4	1+0	1	1+0	0
26	DF	(England) ENG	Jack Simpson	21	0	12+7	0	2+0	0	0+0	0
27	MF	(Wales) WAL	Rubin Colwill	22	0	4+16	0	1+0	0	0+1	0
28	GK	(England) ENG	Rohan Luthra	1	0	0+1	0	0+0	0	0+0	0
29	FW	(Wales) WAL	Mark Harris	38	3	14+21	3	2+0	0	1+0	0
31	FW	(England) ENG	Connor Wickham	12	1	5+7	1	0+0	0	0+0	0
33	DF	(England) ENG	Jai Semenyo	1	0	0+0	0	0+0	0	0+1	0
35	MF	(England) ENG	Andy Rinomhota	41	0	27+12	0	2+0	0	0+0	0
38	DF	(England) ENG	Perry Ng	44	1	42+1	1	0+1	0	0+0	0
39	FW	(Wales) WAL	Isaak Davies	12	1	2+8	1	1+1	0	0+0	0
47	FW	(Republic of Ireland) IRL	Callum Robinson	23	7	19+3	5	0+1	2	0+0	0
48	FW	(Guinea) GUI	Sory Kaba*	17	8	12+5	8	0+0	0	0+0	0
Players out on loan:
14	MF	(England) ENG	Ollie Tanner	2	0	0+0	0	0+1	0	1+0	0
36	FW	(England) ENG	Max Watters	11	0	8+3	0	0+0	0	0+0	0
Players who left the club:
16	DF	(England) ENG	Curtis Nelson	12	0	4+5	0	2+0	0	1+0	0
37	DF	(France) FRA	Niels Nkounkou*	18	0	15+3	0	0+0	0	0+0	0

=== Goals record ===
As of 8 May 2023

Rank	No.	Nat.	Po.	Name	Championship	FA Cup	EFL Cup	Total
1	48	(Guinea)	CF	Sory Kaba	8	0	0	8
2	47	(Republic of Ireland)	LW	Callum Robinson	5	2	0	7
3	25	(England)	LW	Jaden Philogene	4	1	0	5
4	9	(England)	CF	Kion Etete	3	0	0	3
4	11	(Republic of Ireland)	LW	Callum O'Dowda	3	0	0	3
4	19	(Saint Kitts and Nevis)	CM	Romaine Sawyers	3	0	0	3
4	23	(Ivory Coast)	CB	Cédric Kipré	3	0	0	3
4	29	(Wales)	CF	Mark Harris	3	0	0	3
9	6	(England)	DM	Ryan Wintle	2	0	0	2
9	10	(England)	LW	Sheyi Ojo	1	1	0	2
9	38	(England)	CB	Perry Ng	2	0	0	2
12	8	(England)	CM	Joe Ralls	1	0	0	1
12	20	(Northern Ireland)	RW	Gavin Whyte	1	0	0	1
12	31	(England)	CF	Connor Wickham	1	0	0	1
12	39	(Wales)	SS	Isaak Davies	1	0	0	1
Total					41	4	0	45

=== Assists record ===
As of 8 May 2023

Rank	No.	Nat.	Po.	Name	Championship	FA Cup	EFL Cup	Total
1	47	(Republic of Ireland)	LW	Callum Robinson	6	0	0	6
2	2	(Antigua and Barbuda)	RB	Mahlon Romeo	4	0	0	4
2	35	(England)	CM	Andy Rinomhota	3	1	0	4
4	6	(England)	CM	Ryan Wintle	3	0	0	3
4	11	(Republic of Ireland)	LW	Callum O'Dowda	3	0	0	3
6	8	(England)	CM	Joe Ralls	2	0	0	2
6	31	(England)	CF	Connor Wickham	2	0	0	2
6	38	(England)	RB	Perry Ng	2	0	0	2
9	9	(England)	CF	Kion Etete	1	0	0	1
9	20	(Northern Ireland)	RW	Gavin Whyte	1	0	0	1
9	25	(England)	LW	Jaden Philogene	1	0	0	1
9	27	(Wales)	AM	Rubin Colwill	1	0	0	1
9	37	(France)	LB	Niels Nkounkou	1	0	0	1
9	48	(Guinea)	CF	Sory Kaba	1	0	0	1
Total					31	1	0	33

=== Disciplinary record ===
As of 8 May 2023

Rank	No.	Nat.	Po.	Name	Championship			FA Cup			EFL Cup			Total		
Rank	No.	Nat.	Po.	Name	Yellow card	(yellow card) (yellow-red card)	Red card	Yellow card	(yellow card) (yellow-red card)	Red card	Yellow card	(yellow card) (yellow-red card)	Red card	Yellow card	(yellow card) (yellow-red card)	Red card
1	23	(Ivory Coast)	CB	Cédric Kipré	10	0	0	0	0	0	0	0	0	10	0	0
2	38	(England)	RB	Perry Ng	6	1	0	0	0	0	0	0	0	6	1	0
3	6	(England)	DM	Ryan Wintle	6	0	0	1	0	0	0	0	0	7	0	0
3	8	(England)	CM	Joe Ralls	7	0	0	0	0	0	0	0	0	7	0	0
5	1	(England)	GK	Ryan Allsop	5	0	1	0	0	0	0	0	0	5	0	1
5	11	(Republic of Ireland)	LW	Callum O'Dowda	6	0	0	0	0	0	0	0	0	6	0	0
5	29	(Wales)	CF	Mark Harris	6	0	0	0	0	0	0	0	0	6	0	0
8	37	(France)	LB	Niels Nkounkou	5	0	0	0	0	0	0	0	0	5	0	0
9	2	(Antigua and Barbuda)	RB	Mahlon Romeo	4	0	0	0	0	0	0	0	0	4	0	0
9	5	(Republic of Ireland)	CB	Mark McGuinness	4	0	0	0	0	0	0	0	0	4	0	0
9	9	(England)	CF	Kion Etete	4	0	0	0	0	0	0	0	0	4	0	0
9	26	(England)	CB	Jack Simpson	3	0	1	0	0	0	0	0	0	3	0	1
9	35	(England)	CM	Andy Rinomhota	4	0	0	0	0	0	0	0	0	4	0	0
14	10	(England)	LW	Sheyi Ojo	3	0	0	0	0	0	0	0	0	3	0	0
14	16	(England)	CB	Curtis Nelson	2	0	0	0	0	0	1	0	0	3	0	0
16	12	(England)	DM	Tom Sang	0	0	0	2	0	0	0	0	0	2	0	0
16	19	(Saint Kitts and Nevis)	CM	Romaine Sawyers	2	0	0	0	0	0	0	0	0	2	0	0
16	47	(Republic of Ireland)	LW	Callum Robinson	1	0	1	0	0	0	0	0	0	1	0	1
19	3	(Republic of Ireland)	LB	Joel Bagan	0	0	0	0	0	1	0	0	0	0	0	1
19	17	(Nigeria)	LB	Jamilu Collins	1	0	0	0	0	0	0	0	0	1	0	0
19	20	(Northern Ireland)	RW	Gavin Whyte	1	0	0	0	0	0	0	0	0	1	0	0
19	21	(England)	GK	Jak Alnwick	1	0	0	0	0	0	0	0	0	1	0	0
19	22	(England)	RB	Vontae Daley-Campbell	0	0	0	0	0	0	0	0	1	0	0	1
19	25	(England)	LW	Jaden Philogene	1	0	0	0	0	0	0	0	0	1	0	0
19	27	(Wales)	AM	Rubin Colwill	1	0	0	0	0	0	0	0	0	1	0	0
Total					83	1	4	3	0	1	1	0	1	87	1	6

=== Clean sheets ===
Includes all competitive matches. The list is sorted by squad number when total clean sheets are equal. Numbers in parentheses represent games where both goalkeepers participated and both kept a clean sheet; the number in parentheses is awarded to the goalkeeper who was substituted on, whilst a full clean sheet is awarded to the goalkeeper who was on the field at the start of play.

As of match played 8 May 2023

Rank	No.	Nat.	Name	Matches played	Championship	FA Cup	EFL Cup	Total
1	1	(England)	Ryan Allsop	43	12	0	0	12
2	21	(England)	Jak Alnwick	7	0	0	0	0
2	28	(England)	Rohan Luthra	1	0	0	0	0

=== Captains ===
Correct as of match played on 8 May 2023

No.	Nat.	Pos.	Name	Championship	FA Cup	EFL Cup	Total
8	(England)	CM	Joe Ralls	29	0	1	30
6	(England)	DM	Ryan Wintle	16	0	0	16
~~16~~	(England)	CB	Curtis Nelson	0	2	0	2

=== Contracts ===
Date	Position	Nationality	Name	Status	Contract Length	Expiry Date	Ref.
10 June 2022	GK	(England)	Rohan Luthra	Signed	2 years	June 2024	
26 June 2022	CM	(England)	Joe Ralls	Signed	2 years	June 2024	

== Transfers ==
=== In ===
Date	Pos	Player	Transferred from	Fee	Ref
10 June 2022 (Note: The transfer was announced on 18 May, and would become official on June 10 once the transfer window opened)	LW	(England) Ollie Tanner	(England) Lewes	Undisclosed	
15 June 2022	RB	(Antigua and Barbuda) Mahlon Romeo	(England) Millwall	Undisclosed	
1 July 2022 (Note: The transfer was announced on 13 May, and would become official on July 1 once his Forest Green Rovers contract expired)	CM	(The Gambia) Ebou Adams	(England) Forest Green Rovers	Free Transfer	
1 July 2022 (Note: The transfer was announced on 16 June, and would become official on July 1 once his Derby County contract expired)	GK	(England) Ryan Allsop	(England) Derby County	Free Transfer	
1 July 2022 (Note: The transfer was announced on 17 May, and would become official on July 1 once his St Mirren contract expired)	GK	(England) Jak Alnwick	(Scotland) St Mirren	Free Transfer	
1 July 2022 (Note: The transfer was announced on 20 May, and would become official on July 1 once his SC Paderborn contract expired)	LB	(Nigeria) Jamilu Collins	(Germany) SC Paderborn	Free Transfer	
1 July 2022 (Note: The transfer was announced on 15 June, and would become official on July 1 once his Leicester City contract expired)	RB	(England) Vontae Daley-Campbell	(England) Leicester City	Free Transfer	
1 July 2022 (Note: The transfer was announced on 8 June, and would become official on July 1 once his Bristol City contract expired)	LW	(Republic of Ireland) Callum O'Dowda	(England) Bristol City	Free Transfer	
1 July 2022 (Note: The transfer was announced on 24 June, and would become official on July 1 once his Reading contract expired)	CM	(England) Andy Rinomhota	(England) Reading	Free Transfer	
6 July 2022	AM	(Saint Kitts and Nevis) Romaine Sawyers	(England) West Bromwich Albion	Free Transfer	
13 July 2022	LW	(England) Sheyi Ojo	(England) Liverpool	Free Transfer	
4 August 2022	CF	(England) Kion Etete	(England) Tottenham Hotspur	£500,000	
9 August 2022	CB	(England) Jack Simpson	(Scotland) Rangers	Undisclosed	
10 August 2022	CM	(England) Cameron Antwi	(England) Blackpool	Free Transfer	
10 August 2022	MF	(England) Raheem Conte	(England) Queens Park Rangers	Free Transfer	
1 September 2022	LW	(Republic of Ireland) Callum Robinson	(England) West Bromwich Albion	Undisclosed	
12 September 2022	CB	(Denmark) Sebastian Kristensen	(England) Everton	Free Transfer	
14 February 2023	CF	(England) Connor Wickham	Free agent	Free Transfer	
21 February 2023	LM	(England) Lennon Peake	(England) West Ham United	Free Transfer	

=== Out ===
Date	Pos	Player	Transferred to	Fee	Ref
10 June 2022 (Note: The transfer was announced on 25 May, and would become official on June 10 once the transfer window opened)	CM	(Wales) Sam Bowen	(Wales) Newport County	Undisclosed	
24 June 2022	CB	(Wales) James Connolly	(England) Bristol Rovers	Undisclosed	
30 June 2022	CM	(Curaçao) Leandro Bacuna	(England) Watford	Released	
30 June 2022	CB	(England) Ibrahim Bakare	(England) Weymouth	Released	
30 June 2022	LB	(Northern Ireland) Ciaron Brown	(England) Oxford United	Released	
30 June 2022	DM	(Ivory Coast) Tavio Kouakou D'Almeida	Unattached	Released	
30 June 2022	CB	(England) Aden Flint	(England) Stoke City	Released	
30 June 2022	CF	(Wales) Siyabonga Ligendza	(England) AFC Fylde	Released	
30 June 2022	RW	(Zambia) Ntazana Mayembe	Unattached	Released	
30 June 2022	LW	(England) Josh Murphy	(England) Oxford United	Released	
30 June 2022	CM	(England) Marlon Pack	(England) Portsmouth	Released	
30 June 2022	CM	(Wales) Keenan Patten	(England) AFC Fylde	Released	
30 June 2022	GK	(England) Alex Smithies	(England) Leicester City	Released	
30 June 2022	CF	(England) Isaac Vassell	Unattached	Released	
30 June 2022	DM	(Wales) Will Vaulks	(England) Sheffield Wednesday	Released	
13 July 2022	CF	(Republic of Ireland) James Collins	(England) Derby County	Free transfer	
5 January 2023	CB	(England) Sean Morrison	(England) Rotherham United	Released	]
28 January 2023	CB	(England) Curtis Nelson	(England) Blackpool	Mutual Consent	
27 February 2023	CF	(Wales) Gabriele Biancheri	(England) Manchester United	Undisclosed	

=== Loans in ===
Date	Pos	Player	Loaned from	On loan until	Ref
15 July 2022	CB	(Ivory Coast) Cédric Kipré	(England) West Bromwich Albion	End of Season	
26 July 2022	LW	(England) Jaden Philogene	(England) Aston Villa	End of Season	
27 August 2022	LB	(France) Niels Nkounkou	(England) Everton	14 January 2023 (Note: On 14 January, Nounkou was recalled to Everton)	
31 January 2023	CF	(Guinea) Sory Kaba	(Denmark) Midtjylland	End of Season	

=== Loans out ===
Date	Pos	Player	Loaned to	On loan until	Ref
10 June 2022 (Note: The loan agreement was announced on 3 June, and would become active on June 10 when the transfer window opened)	CF	(Zambia) Chanka Zimba	(Wales) Newport County	1 January 2023	
1 July 2022	AM	(Wales) Kieron Evans	(England) Torquay United	End of Season	
27 July 2022	GK	(England) Dillon Phillips	(Belgium) KV Oostende	End of Season	
18 August 2022	CB	(Republic of Ireland) Mark McGuinness	(England) Sheffield Wednesday	19 January 2023 (Note: On 19 January, McGuinness was recalled from his loan at Sheffield Wednesday)	
25 August 2022	CM	(Wales) Eli King	(England) Crewe Alexandra	1 January 2023	
5 January 2023	CF	(England) Max Watters	(England) Barnsley	End of Season	
9 January 2023	LW	(England) Ollie Tanner	(England) York City	End of Season	
31 January 2023	LB	(Wales) Thomas Davies	(Wales) Pontypridd United		
31 January 2023	RW	(England) Jack Leahy	(Wales) Haverfordwest County	End of Season	

== Pre-season and friendlies ==
On 30 May, the Bluebirds announced their pre-season schedule with six matches arranged.

Win Draw Loss Fixtures

9 July 2022 Friendly	Cardiff City	3–2	Cambridge United	Leckwith
13:00 BST	Collins 10'; Watters 57'; Bagan 70'	Report	Knibbs 38'; Janneh 88'	Stadium: Cardiff International Sports Stadium

12 July 2022 Friendly	Cardiff City	2–0	Newport County	Leckwith
18:30 BST	Whyte 77'; Crole 82'	Report		Stadium: Cardiff International Sports Stadium

16 July 2022 Friendly	Cheltenham Town	1–2	Cardiff City	Cheltenham
15:00 BST	Sercombe 42'	Report	Harris 59' (pen.); Watters 88'	Stadium: The Completely-Suzuki Stadium

19 July 2022 Friendly	Shrewsbury Town	0–0	Cardiff City	Shrewsbury
20:00 BST		Report		Stadium: Montgomery Waters Meadow

23 July 2022 Friendly	Swindon Town	2–4	Cardiff City	Swindon
12:00 BST	Shade 73'; Wakeling 87'	Report	Watters 14'; Rinomhota 17'; Wintle 44'; Ojo 76'	Stadium: County Ground

30 November 2022 Peter Whittingham Memorial Match	Cardiff City	3–1	Aston Villa	Cardiff
19:30 GMT	Tanner 40'; Etete 54', 73'	Report	Ramsey 59'	Stadium: Cardiff City Stadium

== Competitions ==
=== Overall record ===
Competition	First match	Last match	Starting round	Record							
Competition	First match	Last match	Starting round	Pld	W	D	L	GF	GA	GD	Win %
Championship	30 July 2022	8 May 2023	Matchday 1	46	13	10	23	41	58	−17	28.26
FA Cup	8 January 2023	18 January 2023	Third round	2	0	1	1	4	7	−3	0.00
EFL Cup	9 August 2022	9 August 2022	First round	1	0	0	1	0	3	−3	0.00
Total				49	13	11	25	45	68	−23	26.53

Last updated: 8 May 2023
Source: [Soccerway]

=== Championship ===
==== League table ====
Pos	Team	Pld	W	D	L	GF	GA	GD	Pts	Promotion, qualification or relegation
18	Huddersfield Town	46	14	11	21	47	62	−15	53	
19	Rotherham United	46	11	17	18	49	60	−11	50	
20	Queens Park Rangers	46	13	11	22	44	71	−27	50	
21	Cardiff City	46	13	10	23	41	58	−17	49	
22	Reading (R)	46	13	11	22	46	68	−22	44 (Note: Reading were deducted 6 points for breaching an EFL business plan.)	Relegation to League One
23	Blackpool (R)	46	11	11	24	48	72	−24	44	Relegation to League One
24	Wigan Athletic (R)	46	10	15	21	38	65	−27	39 (Note: Wigan Athletic received a 3 point deduction in March 2023 after breaching a suspended sentence for late wage payments, followed by a further 3 point penalty in May 2023 for paying players late.)	Relegation to League One

Source: EFL Official Website
Rules for classification: 1) Points; 2) Goal difference; 3) Number of goals scored; 4) Head-to-head results; 5) Wins; 6) Away goals; 7) Penalty points (sec 9.5); 8) 12-point sending off offences
(R) Relegated

==== Results summary ====
Overall								Home						Away					
Pld	W	D	L	GF	GA	GD	Pts	W	D	L	GF	GA	GD	W	D	L	GF	GA	GD
46	13	10	23	41	58	−17	49	6	7	10	20	24	−4	7	3	13	21	34	−13

Last updated: 8 May 2023.
Source: [Soccerway]

==== Results by round ====
Round	1	2	3	4	5	6	7	8	9	10	11	12	13	14	15	16	17	18	19	20	21	22	23	24	25	26	27	28	29	30	31	32	33	34	35	36	37	38	39	40	41	42	43	44	45	46
Ground	H	A	H	A	A	H	H	A	A	A	H	H	A	H	A	A	H	H	A	H	H	A	H	H	A	A	H	H	A	A	H	A	H	A	H	A	H	H	A	H	A	A	H	A	H	A
Result	W	L	W	D	L	D	L	L	W	L	D	W	W	L	L	L	W	L	W	L	L	D	D	D	D	L	D	L	L	L	L	W	W	L	W	L	D	L	W	L	L	W	D	W	L	L
Position	6	9	5	6	12	14	17	21	15	18	18	15	10	18	18	20	17	18	14	18	19	18	20	20	19	21	21	21	21	21	21	21	20	21	21	21	21	21	19	21	21	19	20	18	20	21

Updated to match(es) played on 8 May 2023. Source: [ Soccerway]
A = Away; H = Home; W = Win; D = Draw; L = Loss; P = Postponed

==== Matches ====
Win Draw Loss Fixtures

On 23 June, the league fixtures were announced.

30 July 2022 1	Cardiff City	1–0	Norwich City	Leckwith
15:00 BST	Kipré (yellow card) 44'; Sawyers 49'; O'Dowda (yellow card) 54'; Ralls (yellow card) 69'; Rinomhota (yellow card) 69'; Ng (yellow card) 69' (yellow-red card) 73'	BBC Report; Sky Report	Hanley (yellow card) 68' (yellow-red card) 85'	Stadium: Cardiff City Stadium; Attendance: 19,969; Referee: Tim Robinson (West Sussex)

6 August 2022 2	Reading	2–1	Cardiff City	Reading
15:00 BST	Hoilett (yellow card) 20'; Long 27' (pen.); Ince 63'; Abrefa (yellow card) 86'; Yiadom (yellow card) 90'	BBC Report; Sky Report	O'Dowda 4'; Nelson (yellow card) 25'; Collins (yellow card) 65'; Harris (yellow card) 90'	Stadium: Select Car Leasing Stadium; Attendance: 13,866; Referee: Darren England (Doncaster)

13 August 2022 3	Cardiff City	1–0	Birmingham City	Leckwith
12:30 BST	Philogene 17'; Ojo (yellow card) 90+1'	BBC Report; Sky Report	Hogan (yellow card) 51'; James (yellow card) 70'; Trusty (yellow card) 90'; Colin (yellow card) 90+6'	Stadium: Cardiff City Stadium; Attendance: 18,893; Referee: Darren Bond (Lancashire)
Note: Live on Sky TV

17 August 2022 4	West Bromwich Albion	0–0	Cardiff City	West Bromwich
20:00 BST	O'Shea (yellow card) 21'; Livermore (yellow card) 31'; Molumby (yellow card) 54'	BBC Report; Sky report	Ojo (yellow card) 33'; Ng (yellow card) 48'; Allsop (yellow card) 72'	Stadium: The Hawthorns; Attendance: 21,820; Referee: Andrew Madley (Yorkshire)

21 August 2022 5	Bristol City	2–0	Cardiff City	Ashton Gate
12:00 BST	Massengo (yellow card) 36'; Conway 41'; Vyner (yellow card) 60'; Atkinson 64'; Williams (yellow card) 81'; Scott (yellow card) 89'	BBC report Sky report	Kipré (yellow card) 63'; Colwill (yellow card) 75'; Wintle (yellow card) 89'	Stadium: Ashton Gate; Attendance: 21,649; Referee: Thomas Bramall (Sheffield)
Note: Live on Sky TV

27 August 2022 6	Cardiff City	0–0	Preston North End	Cardiff
15:00 BST		BBC Report; Sky report	Whiteman (yellow card) 54'; Potts (yellow card) 81'	Stadium: Cardiff City Stadium; Attendance: 17,922; Referee: Andy Woolmer (Northamptonshire)

30 August 2022 7	Cardiff City	1–2	Luton Town	Cardiff
19:45 BST	Sawyers 85'	BBC report Sky report	Freeman (yellow card) 21', (goal) 47'; Adebayo (yellow card) 45+1'; Osho 62', (yellow card) 63'	Stadium: Cardiff City Stadium; Attendance: 17,202; Referee: James Linington (Isle of Wight)

3 September 2022 8	Millwall	2–0	Cardiff City	Bermondsey
15:00 BST	Cresswell 63'; Styles (yellow card) 76'; Wallace (yellow card) 88'; Afobe 90'	BBC Report; Sky report	Kipré (yellow card) 46'; Romeo (yellow card) 53'	Stadium: The Den; Attendance: 13,010; Referee: Jeremy Simpson (Lancashire)

10 September 2022	Cardiff City	Postponed	Hull City	Cardiff
15:00 BST				Stadium: Cardiff City Stadium
Note: Fixture was postponed as a mark of respect following the passing of Queen Elizabeth II.

13 September 2022 9	Middlesbrough	2–3	Cardiff City	Middlesbrough
19:45 BST	Watmore 76'; Muniz 77'; McGree (yellow card) 81'	BBC Report; Sky report	O'Dowda 4'; Harris 20'; Ng 45'; Wintle (yellow card) 85'	Stadium: Riverside Stadium; Attendance: 22,124; Referee: Darren Bond (Lancashire)

17 September 2022 10	Huddersfield Town	1–0	Cardiff City	Huddersfield
15:00 BST	Rhodes 8'; Kasumu (yellow card) 69'; Jones (yellow card) 76'; Nicholls (yellow card) 90'	BBC Report; Sky report		Stadium: John Smith's Stadium; Attendance: 19,193; Referee: Dean Whitestone (Northampton)

1 October 2022 11	Cardiff City	1–1	Burnley	Cardiff
15:00 BST	Nkounkou (yellow card) 32'; Ng (yellow card) 47'; Kipré (yellow card) 51'; Robinson 90'	BBC Report; Sky report	Tella 48'	Stadium: Cardiff City Stadium; Attendance: 18,508; Referee: Gavin Ward (Surrey)

4 October 2022 12	Cardiff City	1–0	Blackburn Rovers	Cardiff
20:00 BST	Ojo (yellow card) 33'; Sawyers (yellow card) 56'; Harris 83'	BBC Report; Sky report	Szmodics (yellow card) 34'; Gallagher (yellow card) 84'	Stadium: Cardiff City Stadium; Attendance: 16,150; Referee: John Brooks (Leicestershire)
Note: Live on Sky TV

8 October 2022 13	Wigan Athletic	1–3	Cardiff City	Wigan
15:00 BST	Bennet (yellow card) 40'; Power (yellow card) 43'; Shinnie (yellow card) 61'; Wyke 83', (yellow card) 90+1'	BBC Report; Sky report	Robinson 7'; Ralls (yellow card) 57'; O'Dowda (yellow card) 61'; Ojo 65'; Wintle 90+1'	Stadium: DW Stadium; Attendance: 10,304; Referee: James Bell (Yorkshire)

15 October 2022 14	Cardiff City	0–1	Coventry City	Cardiff
15:00 BST	Harris (yellow card) 55'	BBC report Sky report	Gyökeres 34' (yellow card) 40'; Sheaf (yellow card) 48'; Panzo (yellow card) 55'; Bidwell (yellow card) 90+5'	Stadium: Cardiff City Stadium; Attendance: 19,861; Referee: Robert Madley (West Yorkshire)

19 October 2022 15	Queens Park Rangers	3–0	Cardiff City	White City, London
19:45 BST	Dykes 19' (pen.), 33'; Johansen (yellow card) 26'; Paal 74', (yellow card) 79'	BBC Report; Sky report	Ng (yellow card) 1'; Simpson (red card) 18'; Nelson (yellow card) 28'; Nkounkou (yellow card) 54'; Wintle (yellow card) 70'; Harris (yellow card) 73'	Stadium: Loftus Road; Attendance: 12,805; Referee: James Linington (Isle of Wight)

23 October 2022 16	Swansea City	2–0	Cardiff City	Swansea
12:00 BST	Cooper 38'; Darling (yellow card) 50'; Obafemi (yellow card) 58' (goal) 67'; Cundle (yellow card) 60'	BBC report Sky report	Robinson (red card) 7'; O'Dowda (yellow card) 50'; Ralls (yellow card) 61'; Harris (yellow card) 90+1'	Stadium: Swansea.com Stadium; Attendance: 19,814; Referee: Darren Bond (Lancashire)
Note: Live on Sky TV

29 October 2022 17	Cardiff City	1–0	Rotherham United	Cardiff
15:00 BST	Philogene 65'	BBC report Sky report	Peltier (yellow card) 73'	Stadium: Cardiff City Stadium; Attendance: 17,395; Referee: Oliver Langford (West Midlands)

2 November 2022 18	Cardiff City	1–2	Watford	Cardiff
19:45 GMT	Kipré 9'; Nkounkou (yellow card) 40'; Wintle (yellow card) 77'	BBC report Sky report	Sierralta 38'; Sarr 59'; Sema (yellow card) 77'; Gaspar (yellow card) 82'	Stadium: Cardiff City Stadium; Attendance: 17,036; Referee: Keith Stroud (Hampshire)

5 November 2022 19	Sunderland	0–1	Cardiff City	Sunderland
15:00 GMT	Batth (yellow card) 13'; Neil (yellow card) 32'; O'Nien (yellow card) 45+2'; Embleton (yellow card) 90+5'	BBC report Sky report	Harris 49'; Wintle (yellow card) 53'; Nkounkou (yellow card) 65'; Kipré (yellow card) 90+5'	Stadium: Stadium of Light; Attendance: 27,015; Referee: Andy Davies (Hampshire)

8 November 2022 20	Cardiff City	2–3	Hull City	Cardiff
19:45 GMT	Robinson 47'; Whyte 62'	BBC report Sky report	Pelkas 4'; Slater 75', 77'; Sinik (yellow card) 90+1'	Stadium: Cardiff City Stadium; Attendance: 16,387; Referee: James Bell (Yorkshire)

12 November 2022 21	Cardiff City	0–1	Sheffield United	Cardiff
15:00 GMT		BBC report Sky report	Baldock 64'; Stevens (yellow card) 79'	Stadium: Cardiff City Stadium; Attendance: 18,700; Referee: Matt Donohue (Manchester)

10 December 2022 22	Stoke City	2–2	Cardiff City	Stoke-on-Trent
15:00 GMT	Campbell 11'; Delap 18'; Souttar (yellow card) 39'	BBC report Sky report	Wintle 6'; Nkounkou (yellow card) 52'; Robinson 58'; Allsop (yellow card) 90'	Stadium: Bet365 Stadium; Attendance: 20,111; Referee: Andy Woolmer (Northamptonshire)

17 December 2022 23	Cardiff City	1–1	Blackpool	Cardiff
15:00 GMT	Robinson (yellow card) 15'; Etete 36'; O'Dowda (yellow card) 41'; Whyte (yellow card) 47'	BBC report Sky report	Madine (yellow card) 51', (goal) 67', Patino (yellow card) 62'; Williams (yellow card) 87'	Stadium: Cardiff City Stadium; Attendance: 17,544; Referee: Josh Smith (Peterborough)

26 December 2022 24	Cardiff City	0–0	Queens Park Rangers	Cardiff
17:15 GMT	Wintle (yellow card) 32'; Romeo (yellow card) 85'	Sky report BBC Report	Iroegbunam (yellow card) 4'; Laird (yellow card) 59'; Roberts (yellow card) 86'	Stadium: Cardiff City Stadium; Attendance: 18,549; Referee: Keith Stroud (Wessex)
Note: Live on Sky TV

29 December 2022 25	Coventry City	0–0	Cardiff City	Coventry
19:45 GMT	Sheaf (yellow card) 62'; Panzo (yellow card) 76'	BBC report Sky report	Kipré (yellow card) 45+3'	Stadium: Coventry Building Society Arena; Attendance: 21,421; Referee: Anthony Backhouse (Cumbria)

1 January 2023 26	Blackburn Rovers	1–0	Cardiff City	Blackburn
12:00 GMT	Garrett (yellow card) 13'; Dack 48'; Hedges (yellow card) 49'; Wharton (yellow card) 65'	BBC report Sky report	Simpson (yellow card) 28'; Harris (yellow card) 65'	Stadium: Ewood Park; Attendance: 12,499; Referee: Thomas Bramall (Sheffield)
Note: Live on Sky TV

14 January 2023 27	Cardiff City	1–1	Wigan Athletic	Cardiff
15:00 GMT	Ralls (yellow card) 21'; Simpson (yellow card) 41'; Ng (yellow card) 70'; O'Dowda 82'; Allsop (yellow card) 90+1'	BBC report Sky report	Caulker (yellow card) 79'; Magennis (yellow card) 90+5'; Keane 90+6'	Stadium: Cardiff City Stadium; Attendance: 18,041; Referee: Jeremy Simpson (Lancashire)

21 January 2023 28	Cardiff City	0–1	Millwall	Cardiff
15:00 GMT		BBC report Sky report	Bradshaw 26'	Stadium: Cardiff City Stadium; Attendance: 18,838; Referee: Leigh Doughty (Lancashire)

31 January 2023 29	Luton Town	1–0	Cardiff City	Luton
19:45 GMT	Doughty (yellow card) 49'; Adebayo (yellow card) 58', (goal) 88'; Morris (yellow card) 90+5'	Sky report BBC Report	Ralls (yellow card) 45+1'; McGuinness (yellow card) 90+5'	Stadium: Kenilworth Road; Attendance: 9,031; Referee: Geoff Eltringham (County Durham)

4 February 2023 30	Hull City	1–0	Cardiff City	Kingston Upon Hull
15:00 GMT	Christie 62'	BBC report Sky report		Stadium: MKM Stadium; Referee: David Webb (County Durham)

11 February 2023 31	Cardiff City	1–3	Middlesbrough	Cardiff
15:00 GMT	Kaba 25'	BBC report Sky report	Forss 17'; Archer 38', (yellow card) 78', Lenihan (yellow card) 72'; McGree 90'	Stadium: Cardiff City Stadium; Attendance: 19,182; Referee: John Busby (Oxfordshire)

14 February 2023 32	Birmingham City	0–2	Cardiff City	Birmingham
19:45 GMT	Mejbri (yellow card) 55'; Bielik (yellow card) 59'; Dean (yellow card) 82'	BBC report Sky report	Etete (yellow card) 59'; Ng 84'; Allsop (yellow card) 90+5'; Robinson 90+5'	Stadium: St Andrew's; Attendance: 14,369; Referee: Gavin Ward (Surrey)

17 February 2023 33	Cardiff City	1–0	Reading	Cardiff
20:00 GMT	McGuinness (yellow card) 38'; Sawyers 90+1'	BBC report Sky report	Dann (yellow card) 27'; Ndiaye (yellow card) 76'	Stadium: Cardiff City Stadium; Attendance: 18,879; Referee: Darren Bond (Lancashire)
Note: Live on Sky TV

25 February 2023 34	Norwich City	2–0	Cardiff City	Norwich
15:00 GMT	Sara 33'; Marquinhos 37'; Núñez (yellow card) 90'	BBC report Sky report	Kipré (yellow card) 83'	Stadium: Carrow Road; Attendance: 25,417; Referee: James Linington (Isle of Wight)

4 March 2023 35	Cardiff City	2–0	Bristol City	Cardiff
12:30 GMT	Kaba 52'; Philogene 70'; Allsop (red card) 90+1'	BBC report Sky report		Stadium: Cardiff City Stadium; Attendance: 22,156; Referee: Matt Donohue (Manchester)

11 March 2023 36	Preston North End	2–0	Cardiff City	Preston
15:00 GMT	Storey (yellow card) 14'; Cannon 68', (yellow card) 90'; Evans 90+4'	BBC report Sky report	McGuinness (yellow card) 41'; Alnwick (red card) 90+2'	Stadium: Deepdale; Attendance: 14,295; Referee: David Webb (County Durham)

15 March 2023 37	Cardiff City	1–1	West Bromwich Albion	Cardiff
19:45 GMT	Kaba 65'; Romeo (yellow card) 68'; Harris (yellow card) 88'	BBC report Sky report	Dike 17'; Yokuslu (yellow card) 33'; Ajayi (yellow card) 90+2'	Stadium: Cardiff City Stadium; Attendance: 17,785; Referee: Leigh Doughty (Lancashire)

18 March 2023	Rotherham United	Abandoned	Cardiff City	Rotherham
15:00 GMT			Philogene 5'	Stadium: AESSEAL New York Stadium; Referee: Oliver Langford (West Midlands)
Note: Fixture was abandoned with 48 minutes played due to unplayable pitch following a rain deluge.

1 April 2023 38	Cardiff City	2–3	Swansea City	Cardiff
15:00 BST	Philogene 35'; Rinomhota (yellow card) 58'; Kaba 83'; Kipré (yellow card) 90+7'	BBC report Sky report	Piroe 3', (yellow card) 90'; Cullen 33'; Manning (yellow card) 45+1'; Ntcham (yellow card) 50'; Fulton (yellow card) 55'; Cooper (yellow card) 57'; Cabango 90+9'	Stadium: Cardiff City Stadium; Attendance: 28,232; Referee: Keith Stroud (Hampshire)

7 April 2023 39	Blackpool	1–3	Cardiff City	Blackpool
15:00 BST	Patino (yellow card) 25'; Bowler 74'; Connolly (yellow card) 76'	BBC report Sky report	Wickham 21'; Kaba 37'; Ralls 40'; Philogene (yellow card) 67'	Stadium: Bloomfield Road; Attendance: 13,462; Referee: Josh Smith (Peterborough)

10 April 2023 40	Cardiff City	0–1	Sunderland	Cardiff
15:00 BST	Ng (yellow card) 59'; Kipré (yellow card) 75'; Etete (yellow card) 76'; Rinomhota (yellow card) 81'	BBC report Sky report	Cirkin 60'; Neil (yellow card) 84'	Stadium: Cardiff City Stadium; Attendance: 23,365; Referee: Thomas Bramall (Sheffield)

15 April 2023 41	Sheffield United	4–1	Cardiff City	Sheffield
12:30 BST	Lowe (yellow card) 17'; McAtee 24'; Berge (yellow card) 38'; Robinson 54'; Baldock (yellow card) 57'; Ndiaye 80'; Clark 85'	BBC report Sky report Club report	Simpson (yellow card) 4'; Kaba 19' (pen.); O'Dowda (yellow card) 52'	Stadium: Bramall Lane; Attendance: 27,768; Referee: David Webb (Lancashire)
Note: Live on Sky TV

19 April 2023 42	Watford	1–3	Cardiff City	Watford
19:45 BST	Sarr 11'; Hoedt (yellow card) 40'; Davis (yellow card) 74'; Ngakia (yellow card) 77'	BBC report Sky report	Etete 31', (yellow card) 39'; Kipré 35'; O'Dowda (yellow card) 38'; Kaba 41'	Stadium: Vicarage Road; Attendance: 17,005; Referee: Jarred Gillett (Australia)

22 April 2023 43	Cardiff City	1–1	Stoke City	Cardiff
15:00 BST	Kaba 29', (penalty missed) 62'; Ralls (yellow card) 33'; Etete (yellow card) 42'; Sawyers (yellow card) 44'	BBC report Sky report Club report	Laurent 16'	Stadium: Cardiff City Stadium; Attendance: 20,058; Referee: Andy Davies (Hampshire)

27 April 2023 44	Rotherham United	1–2	Cardiff City	Rotherham
20:00 BST	Ogbene 37'; Rathbone (yellow card) 59'	BBC report Sky report Club report	Etete 11'; Kaba (penalty missed) 45+2'; Kipré 87'	Stadium: AESSEAL New York Stadium; Attendance: 10,219; Referee: Oliver Langford (West Midlands)
Note: Live on Sky TV

30 April 2023 45	Cardiff City	1–2	Huddersfield Town	Cardiff
12:00 BST	McGuinnes (yellow card) 68'; Davies 83'	BBC report Sky report Club report	Hungbo 61'; Simpson 69' (o.g.)	Stadium: Cardiff City Stadium; Attendance: 26,804; Referee: Michael Salisbury (Lancashire)
Note: Live on Sky TV

8 May 2023 46	Burnley	3–0	Cardiff City	Burnley
15:00 BST	Brownhill 27'; Barnes 31'; Roberts (yellow card) 36'; Twine 27'	BBC report Sky report	Ng (yellow card) 64'; Romeo (yellow card) 87'	Stadium: Turf Moor; Attendance: 21,594; Referee: Matt Donohue (Manchester)

=== FA Cup ===
The Bluebirds entered the competition in the third round and were drawn at home to Leeds United.

Win Draw Loss Fixtures

8 January 2023 Third round	Cardiff City	2–2	Leeds United	Leckwith
14:00 GMT	Sang (yellow card) 9'; Philogene 24'; Ojo 31'; Bagan (yellow card) 35' (red card) 80'; Wintle (yellow card) 83'	BBC report SKY report	Gnonto (yellow card) 27'; Struijk (yellow card) 28'; Rodrigo 65', (penalty missed) 80'; Greenwood (yellow card) 70'; Perkins 90+3'; Wöber (yellow card) 90+6'	Stadium: Cardiff City Stadium; Attendance: 20,324; Referee: Jarred Gillett (Liverpool)
Note: Live on ITV

17 January 2023 Third round replay	Leeds United	5–2	Cardiff City	Leeds
19:45 GMT	Gnonto 1', 36', (yellow card) 40'; Rodrigo 24'; Bamford 71', 76'	BBC report SKY report	Sang (yellow card) 39'; Robinson 84', 90+3' (pen.)	Stadium: Elland Road; Attendance: 34,465; Referee: Thomas Bramall (Sheffield)
Note: Live on ITV4

=== EFL Cup ===
Win Draw Loss Fixtures

Cardiff City were drawn at home to Portsmouth in the first round.

9 August 2022 First round	Cardiff City	0–3	Portsmouth	Cardiff
19:45 BST	Nelson (yellow card) 7'; Daley-Campbell (red card) 89'	BBC Report	Pigott 58'; Mingi (yellow card) 58'; Curtis 68' (pen.); Bishop 72'	Stadium: Cardiff City Stadium; Attendance: 6,303; Referee: Lee Swabey (Devon)
