= Eli King (footballer) =

Welsh footballer

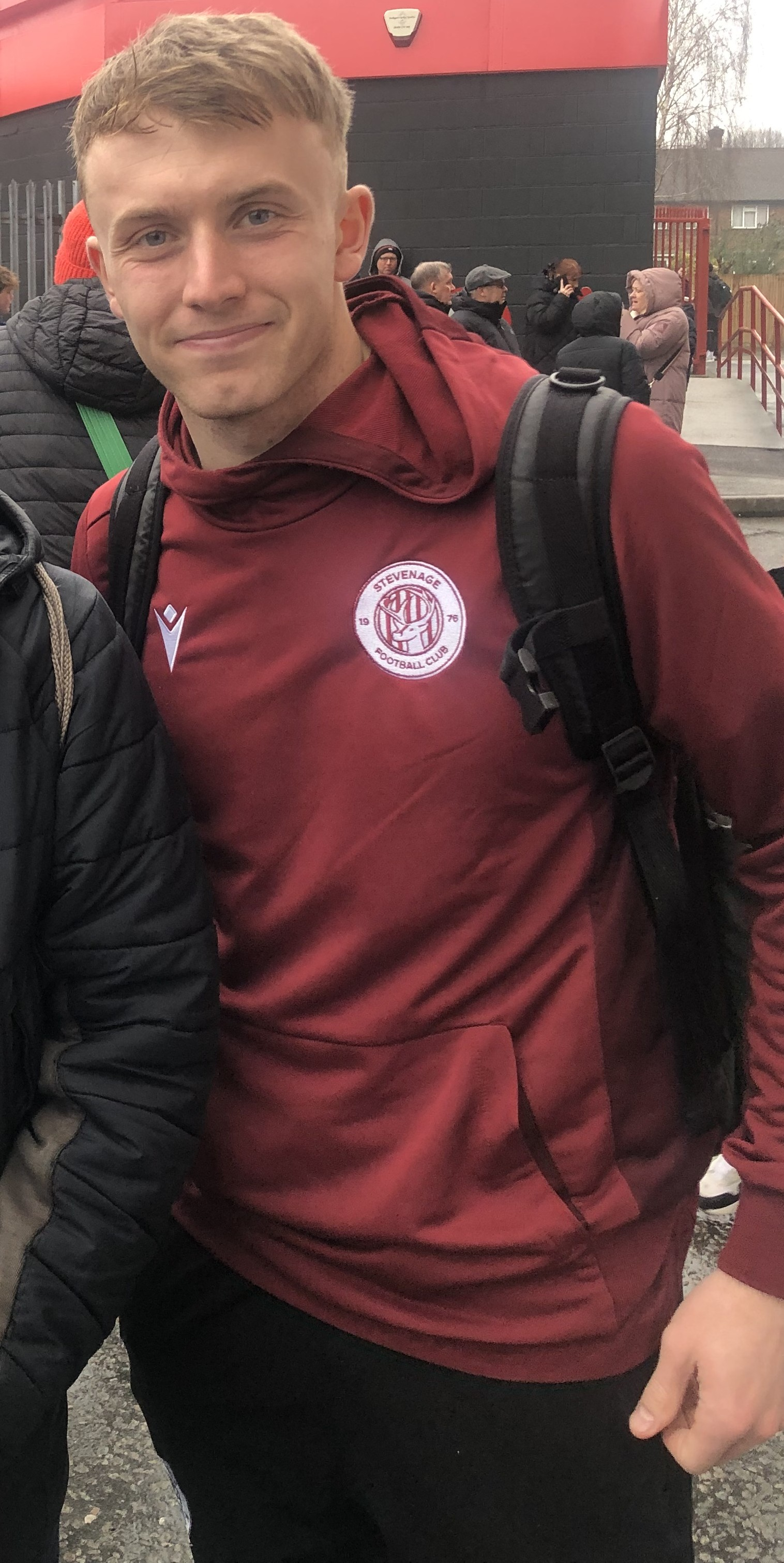
- King in 2025.

Personal information
- Full name: Eli Josef King
- Date of birth: 23 December 2002 (age 23)
- Place of birth: Wales
- Height: 1.88 m (6 ft 2 in)
- Position: Midfielder

Team information
- Current team: Gillingham
- Number: 34

Youth career
- –2021: Cardiff City

Senior career*
Years	Team	Apps	(Gls)
2021–2026	Cardiff City	6	(0)
2022–2023	→ Crewe Alexandra (loan)	15	(0)
2023–2024	→ Morecambe (loan)	20	(1)
2024	→ Ross County (loan)	15	(0)
2024–2025	→ Stevenage (loan)	27	(1)
2026–	Gillingham	4	(0)

International career^{‡}
2018	Wales U17	3	(0)
2021–2024	Wales U21	15	(1)
- * Club domestic league appearances and goals as of 13:08, 27 September 2026 (UTC) ‡ National team caps and goals as of 12:11, 15 October 2024 (UTC)

Eli Josef King (born 23 December 2002) is a Welsh professional footballer who plays as a midfielder for EFL League Two club Gillingham. He is a former Wales under-21 international.

== Club career ==
=== Cardiff City ===
King made his first-team debut for Cardiff City on 23 October 2021 as a second-half substitute in the 2–0 Championship defeat against Middlesbrough.

He moved on loan to Crewe Alexandra in August 2022, making his Crewe debut in a goalless draw at Bradford City on 27 August 2022. He returned to Cardiff in January 2023.

King joined Morecambe in July 2023 on loan for the 2023–24 season. He scored his first goal for Morcambe against Doncaster Rovers on 12 December 2023, in a 5–0 victory. On 8 January 2024, King was recalled by Cardiff City. A week after his return to Cardiff City, he joined Scottish Premiership club Ross County on loan until the end of the season.

In August 2024 he moved on loan to Stevenage for the season.

=== Gillingham ===
On 1 September 2026 King joined EFL League Two club Gillingham for an undisclosed fee.

== International career ==
After playing for Wales under-17s, King was selected for the Wales under-21 squad in November 2021. He was called up again in September 2022 for the Wales under-21s' friendly with Austria.

== Career statistics ==
As of match played 26 September 2026

Appearances and goals by club, season and competition
Club	Season	League			National cup (Note: Includes FA Cup, Scottish Cup)		League cup (Note: Includes EFL Cup)		Other		Total	
Club	Season	Division	Apps	Goals	Apps	Goals	Apps	Goals	Apps	Goals	Apps	Goals
Cardiff City	2021–22	Championship	4	0	1	0	0	0	—		5	0
Cardiff City	2022–23	Championship	1	0	0	0	1	0	—		2	0
Cardiff City	2023–24	Championship	0	0	0	0	0	0	—		0	0
Cardiff City	2024–25	Championship	0	0	0	0	1	0	—		1	0
Cardiff City	2025–26	League One	1	0	0	0	1	0	0	0	2	0
Cardiff City	Total		6	0	1	0	3	0	0	0	10	0
Crewe Alexandra (loan)	2022–23	League Two	15	0	1	0	0	0	2 (Note: Appearance(s) in EFL Trophy)	0	18	0
Morecambe (loan)	2023–24	League Two	20	1	2	1	1	0	1	0	24	2
Ross County (loan)	2023–24	Scottish Premiership	15	0	1	0	0	0	2 (Note: Appearances in the relegation play-offs)	0	18	0
Stevenage (loan)	2024–25	League One	27	1	2	0	0	0	3	0	32	1
Gillingham	2026–27	League Two	4	0	0	0	0	0	0	0	4	0
Career total			87	2	7	1	4	0	8	0	106	3
