= Thomas Davies (footballer, born 2003) =

Welsh footballer

Tom Davies
Personal information
- Full name: Thomas Alfred Davies
- Date of birth: 11 November 2003 (age 23)
- Place of birth: Cardiff, Wales
- Height: 1.80 m (5 ft 11 in)
- Position: Left-back

Team information
- Current team: Newport County
- Number: 3

Youth career
- 2017–2021: Cardiff City

Senior career*
Years	Team	Apps	(Gls)
2021–2025	Cardiff City	0	(0)
2023	→ Pontypridd United (loan)	9	(4)
2023–2024	→ Kilmarnock (loan)	6	(0)
2025–	Newport County	43	(2)

International career^{‡}
2021	Wales U19	3	(0)
2023–2024	Wales U21	4	(0)
- * Club domestic league appearances and goals as of 14:47, 21 November 2026 (UTC) ‡ National team caps and goals as of 15 October 2024 (UTC)

Thomas 'Tom' Alfred Davies (born 2003) is a Welsh professional footballer who plays as a left-back for EFL League Two club Newport County. He is a former Wales under-21 international.

== Career ==
=== Cardiff City ===
Davies joined the youth academy of Cardiff City at the Under-14 level. He started playing as a midfielder, before converting to a left-back. He made his professional debut with Cardiff City in a 3–2 EFL Cup win over Sutton United on 10 August 2021. In July 2023 Davies joined Kilmarnock on loan for the 2023-24 season. On 7 June 2024, Cardiff said it had offered the player a new contract.

=== Newport County ===
On 17 January 2025 Davies joined EFL League Two club Newport County on an 18 month contract. He made his Newport debut on 18 January 2025 as a second-half substitute in the 3-2 EFL League Two defeat to Port Vale. Davies scored his first Newport goal on 7 October 2025 in the EFL Trophy 1-0 win against Cardiff City.

== International career ==
Davies is a youth international for Wales, having represented the Wales U18 in a friendly 0–0 (2–0) penalty shootout loss to the England U18s on 30 March 2021.

In October 2023 he was called up to the Wales Under-21 squad for the 2025 UEFA European Under-21 Championship qualifying match against Czech Republic.

== Career statistics ==
As of match played 21 November 2026

Appearances and goals by club, season and competition
Club	Season	League			National cup (Note: Includes FA Cup, Welsh Cup, Scottish Cup)		League cup (Note: Includes EFL Cup, Welsh League Cup, Scottish League Cup)		Other		Total	
Club	Season	Division	Apps	Goals	Apps	Goals	Apps	Goals	Apps	Goals	Apps	Goals
Cardiff City	2021-22	Championship	0	0	0	0	1	0	—		1	0
Cardiff City	2022-23	Championship	0	0	0	0	0	0	—		0	0
Cardiff City	2023-24	Championship	0	0	0	0	0	0	—		0	0
Cardiff City	2024-25	Championship	0	0	1	0	0	0	—		1	0
Cardiff City	Total		0	0	1	0	1	0	—		2	0
Cardiff Met (loan)	2021-22	Cymru Premier	1	0	0	0	0	0	—		1	0
Pontypridd United (loan)	2022-23	Cymru Premier	9	4	0	0	0	0	—		9	4
Kilmarnock (loan)	2023-24	Scottish Premiership	6	0	0	0	0	0	—		6	0
Kilmarnock B (loan)	2023-24	—			—		—		2 (Note: Appearance(s) in Scottish Challenge Cup)	0	2	0
Cardiff City U21	2024-25	—			—		2	0	—		2	0
Newport County	2024-25	League Two	4	0	1	0	0	0	0	0	5	0
Newport County	2025-26	League Two	33	1	0	0	1	0	1 (Note: Appearance in EFL Trophy)	1	35	2
Newport County	2026-27	League Two	6	1	1	0	1	0	1	0	9	1
Newport County	Total		43	2	2	0	2	0	2	1	49	3
Career total			59	6	3	0	5	0	4	1	71	7
