= Oliver Denham =

Welsh footballer

Personal information
- Full name: Oliver James Denham
- Date of birth: 4 May 2002 (age 24)
- Place of birth: Blackpool, England
- Position: Defender

Youth career
- 2009–2020: Manchester United
- 2020–2021: Cardiff City

Senior career*
Years	Team	Apps	(Gls)
2021–2024	Cardiff City	5	(0)
2023–2024	→ Dundee United (loan)	0	(0)
2024	→ Sligo Rovers (loan)	21	(0)
2024–2026	Sligo Rovers	64	(1)

International career
2018	Wales U17	1	(0)
- * Club domestic league appearances and goals as of 11:56, 14 November 2026 (UTC)

Oliver James Denham (born 4 May 2002) is a professional footballer who plays as a defender.

== Club career ==
=== Cardiff City ===
Denham began his career as a youth player with Manchester United before signing for Cardiff City in September 2020. He made his professional debut for the side as a substitute in place of Sean Morrison during a 2–0 defeat against Brighton & Hove Albion in the EFL Cup on 24 August 2021. Denham made his first start for Cardiff City in the FA Cup fourth round defeat against Liverpool on 6 February 2022.

==== Dundee United loan ====
On 10 July 2023 Denham joined Scottish Championship club Dundee United on loan for the duration of the 2023-24 season. He was recalled by Cardiff in January 2024 having made just one appearance for Dundee United.

=== Sligo Rovers ===
On 2 February 2024, Denham was loaned out to League of Ireland Premier Division club Sligo Rovers until the end of June.

On 7 June 2024, Cardiff said he would be leaving on 30 June 2024 when his contract expired. On 1 July 2024, he made the move to Sligo Rovers permanent, signing a contract until the end of the 2025 season. In 2026, Denham made 33 appearances in all competitions as the club finished bottom of the league and were relegated to play in the League of Ireland First Division for the first time since 2006. In November 2026, the club confirmed that Denham would be departing the club following the end of his contract.

== International career ==
Denham was selected for the Wales under-21 squad for the EURO 2023 qualifying matches against Switzerland and Bulgaria on 25 and 29 March 2022.

On 24 May 2022, he was called up to the senior Wales squad for the 2022 FIFA World Cup qualifier play-off final against Ukraine on 5 June 2022 and the Nations League Group A matches against Poland, Netherlands, Belgium and the Netherlands again on 1 June, 8 June, 11 June and 14 June 2022 respectively.

== Career statistics ==
As of match played on 30 October 2026

Appearances and goals by club, season and competition
Club	Season	League			National Cup (Note: Includes FA Cup, Scottish Cup & FAI Cup)		League Cup (Note: Includes EFL Cup & Scottish League Cup)		Other		Total	
Club	Season	Division	Apps	Goals	Apps	Goals	Apps	Goals	Apps	Goals	Apps	Goals
Cardiff City	2021–22	EFL Championship	5	0	1	0	1	0	—		7	0
Cardiff City	2022–23	EFL Championship	0	0	0	0	1	0	—		1	0
Cardiff City	2023–24	EFL Championship	0	0	0	0	0	0	—		0	0
Cardiff City	Total		5	0	1	0	2	0	—		8	0
Dundee United (loan)	2023–24	Scottish Championship	0	0	0	0	1	0	—		1	0
Sligo Rovers (loan)	2024	LOI Premier Division	21	0	—		—		—		21	0
Sligo Rovers	2024	LOI Premier Division	14	0	2	0	—		—		16	0
Sligo Rovers	2025	LOI Premier Division	20	1	3	0	—		—		23	1
Sligo Rovers	2026	LOI Premier Division	30	0	3	0	—		—		33	0
Sligo Rovers	Total		64	1	8	0	—		—		72	1
Career total			90	1	9	0	2	0	0	0	101	1
