= Kion Etete =

English footballer (born 2001)

Personal information
- Full name: Kion Reece Etete
- Date of birth: 28 November 2001 (age 24)
- Place of birth: Derby, England
- Height: 6 ft 6 in (1.98 m)
- Position: Forward

Team information
- Current team: Newport County (on loan from Cardiff City)
- Number: 26

Youth career
- Notts County

Senior career*
| Years | Team | Apps | (Gls) |
| 2018–2019 | Notts County | 4 | (0) |
| 2019–2022 | Tottenham Hotspur | 0 | (0) |
| 2021 | → Northampton Town (loan) | 18 | (3) |
| 2022 | → Cheltenham Town (loan) | 13 | (3) |
| 2022– | Cardiff City | 56 | (6) |
| 2025 | → Bolton Wanderers (loan) | 5 | (0) |
| 2025–2026 | → Rotherham United (loan) | 11 | (0) |
| 2026 | → St Mirren (loan) | 4 | (0) |
| 2026- | → Newport County (loan) | 6 | (1) |
- * Club domestic league appearances and goals as of 14:53, 21 November 2026 (UTC)

Kion Reece Etete (born 28 November 2001) is an English professional footballer who plays as a forward for EFL League Two club Newport County on loan from EFL Championship club Cardiff City.

== Playing career ==
Etete came through the youth team at Notts County and made his senior debut for the 'Magpies' in a group stage match of the EFL Trophy against Newcastle United U21 on 9 October 2018, coming on as a 76th-minute substitute for fellow youth-team player Tyreece Kennedy-Williams. He made his EFL League Two debut on 3 November, replacing Kristian Dennis 73 minutes into a 2–2 draw with Port Vale at Vale Park; after the game he said "I was nervous because it was a big occasion and I just wanted to keep my head on the game". Manager Harry Kewell said that "Kion was excellent".

=== Tottenham Hotspur ===
In 2019, Etete underwent a trial at Tottenham Hotspur, scoring twice in an U18 game against West Ham United. On 7 June 2019, County announced that Etete had officially joined Tottenham.

At the start of August 2021, Etete signed a new contract with Tottenham until 2023 and went out on loan to Northampton Town for the 2021–22 season. He made his Northampton debut in the Carabao Cup on 11 August 2021, scoring twice against Coventry City in a 2-1 win.

He scored his first league goal on 19 October 2021 in a 3–0 home win against Stevenage.

In January 2022, after being recalled from his loan, he moved to League One side Cheltenham Town on loan until the end of the season.

=== Cardiff City ===
On 31 January 2025, after signing a new contract with Cardiff, he joined League One side Bolton Wanderers on loan for the remainder of the season. He made his debut a day later, coming on as a late substitute against Reading with the score at 0–0. In the 89th minute, the referee adjudged that Etete handballed the ball in the box — with Reading going in to convert the penalty. His new team went on to lose 1–0.

On 1 August 2025, Etete joined fellow League One side Rotherham United on a season-long loan. On 15 January 2026, the loan deal was terminated early. A week later, he joined Scottish Premiership side St Mirren on loan for the remainder of the season. On 1 September 2026 Etete joined EFL League Two club Newport County on loan for the remainder of the 2026-27 season. Etete made his Newport debut as a 52nd minute substitute in the 1-1 League Two draw against York City on 17 October 2026, scoring with his first touch of the ball.

== Personal life ==
Etete was born in England to an English mother and Nigerian father.

== Career statistics ==
As of match played 3 March 2026

| Club | Season | League | | | National cup (Note: Includes FA Cup, Scottish Cup) | | League cup (Note: Includes EFL Cup) | | Other | | Total | |
| Club | Season | Division | Apps | Goals | Apps | Goals | Apps | Goals | Apps | Goals | Apps | Goals |
|---|---|---|---|---|---|---|---|---|---|---|---|---|
| Notts County | 2018–19 | EFL League Two | 4 | 0 | 1 | 0 | 0 | 0 | 1 (Note: Appearance in EFL Trophy) | 0 | 6 | 0 |
| Tottenham Hotspur | 2019–20 | Premier League | 0 | 0 | 0 | 0 | 0 | 0 | 0 | 0 | 0 | 0 |
| Tottenham Hotspur | 2020–21 | Premier League | 0 | 0 | 0 | 0 | 0 | 0 | 0 | 0 | 0 | 0 |
| Tottenham Hotspur | 2021–22 | Premier League | 0 | 0 | 0 | 0 | 0 | 0 | 0 | 0 | 0 | 0 |
| Tottenham Hotspur | Total | | 0 | 0 | 0 | 0 | 0 | 0 | 0 | 0 | 0 | 0 |
| Tottenham Hotspur U23 | 2019–20 | — | | | — | | — | | 1 | 0 | 1 | 0 |
| Northampton Town (loan) | 2021–22 | EFL League Two | 18 | 3 | 2 | 1 | 2 | 2 | 1 | 0 | 23 | 6 |
| Cheltenham Town (loan) | 2021–22 | EFL League One | 13 | 3 | 0 | 0 | 0 | 0 | 0 | 0 | 13 | 3 |
| Cardiff City | 2022–23 | EFL Championship | 28 | 3 | 1 | 0 | 1 | 0 | — | | 30 | 3 |
| Cardiff City | 2023–24 | EFL Championship | 28 | 3 | 1 | 0 | 3 | 3 | — | | 32 | 6 |
| Cardiff City | 2024–25 | EFL Championship | 0 | 0 | 1 | 0 | 0 | 0 | — | | 1 | 0 |
| Cardiff City | 2025–26 | EFL League One | 0 | 0 | 0 | 0 | 0 | 0 | 0 | 0 | 0 | 0 |
| Cardiff City | Total | | 56 | 6 | 3 | 0 | 4 | 3 | 0 | 0 | 63 | 9 |
| Bolton Wanderers (loan) | 2024–25 | EFL League One | 5 | 0 | 0 | 0 | 0 | 0 | 0 | 0 | 5 | 0 |
| Rotherham United (loan) | 2025–26 | EFL League One | 11 | 0 | 0 | 0 | 1 | 0 | 2 | 0 | 14 | 0 |
| St Mirren (loan) | 2025–26 | Scottish Premiership | 4 | 0 | 1 | 0 | — | | — | | 5 | 0 |
| Career total | | | 111 | 12 | 7 | 1 | 7 | 5 | 5 | 0 | 130 | 18 |
