= Jaden Philogene =

English footballer (born 2002)

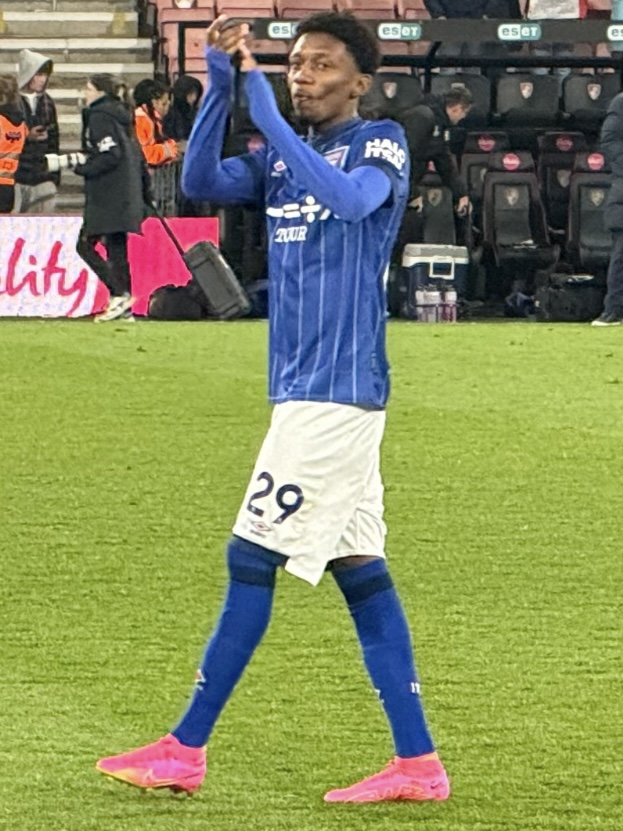
- Philogene with Ipswich Town in 2025

Personal information
- Full name: Jaden Richard Philogene-Bidace
- Date of birth: 8 February 2002 (age 24)
- Place of birth: Hammersmith, Greater London, England
- Height: 5 ft 11 in (1.81 m)
- Position: Winger

Team information
- Current team: Ipswich Town
- Number: 11

Youth career
- 2018–2021: Aston Villa

Senior career*
Years	Team	Apps	(Gls)
2021–2023	Aston Villa	3	(0)
2022	→ Stoke City (loan)	11	(1)
2022–2023	→ Cardiff City (loan)	37	(4)
2023–2024	Hull City	32	(12)
2024–2025	Aston Villa	11	(0)
2025–	Ipswich Town	46	(14)

International career^{‡}
2021	England U20	4	(0)
2023–2025	England U21	9	(4)
- * Club domestic league appearances and goals as of 03:09, 3 May 2026 (UTC) ‡ National team caps and goals as of 21:43, 24 March 2025 (UTC)

Jaden Richard Philogene-Bidace (born 8 February 2002) is an English professional footballer who plays as a winger for Premier League club Ipswich Town. He is a graduate of the Aston Villa Academy and has represented England at youth level.

== Early life ==
Jaden Richard Philogene-Bidace was born on 8 February 2002 in Hammersmith, Greater London. He attended Uxbridge High School, where he was regularly named best footballer.

== Club career ==
=== Aston Villa ===
==== Early career ====
Philogene was signed by the Aston Villa academy from the Pro:Direct Academy in London in January 2018. He spent time on trial at a number of clubs in the English Football League, reportedly including Brentford, before settling at Villa.

After impressing for the Under-23 squad, and reportedly attracting the interest of Barcelona, Paris Saint-Germain and Borussia Dortmund, Philogene signed his first professional contract with Aston Villa.

On 19 May 2021, Philogene was given his first-team debut, coming on as a late substitute in a 2–1 away victory for Aston Villa against Tottenham Hotspur.

==== Loans ====
On 21 January 2022, Philogene joined Championship club Stoke City on loan until the end of the 2021–22 season. The following day, Philogene made his Championship debut as a late substitute in a 3–2 home defeat to Fulham. Philogene played 11 times for Stoke, scoring once in a 3–0 win against Swansea City on 8 February 2022.

On 26 July 2022, Philogene joined Championship club Cardiff City on loan until the end of the 2022–23 season. He made his debut for Cardiff on 6 August 2022, as a late substitute in a league defeat to Reading. Philogene scored his first goal for Cardiff on 13 August, the deciding goal in a 1–0 victory over Aston Villa's bitter rivals Birmingham City.

=== Hull City ===
On 1 September 2023, Philogene signed for Championship club Hull City for an undisclosed fee. He made his debut on 15 September in a 1–1 home draw with Coventry City. In November 2023, Philogene was named Hull City's Player of the Month for October.

On 13 February 2024, Philogene scored the equalising goal in Hull City's 2–1 win at Rotherham United, which was later nominated for the FIFA Puskás Award. In the goal, Philogene nutmegged the opposition defender before putting the ball in the back of the net with a Rabona. While initially recorded as an own goal due to a slight deflection before the ball crossed into the net, the English Football League eventually credited Philogene with the goal.

=== Return to Aston Villa ===
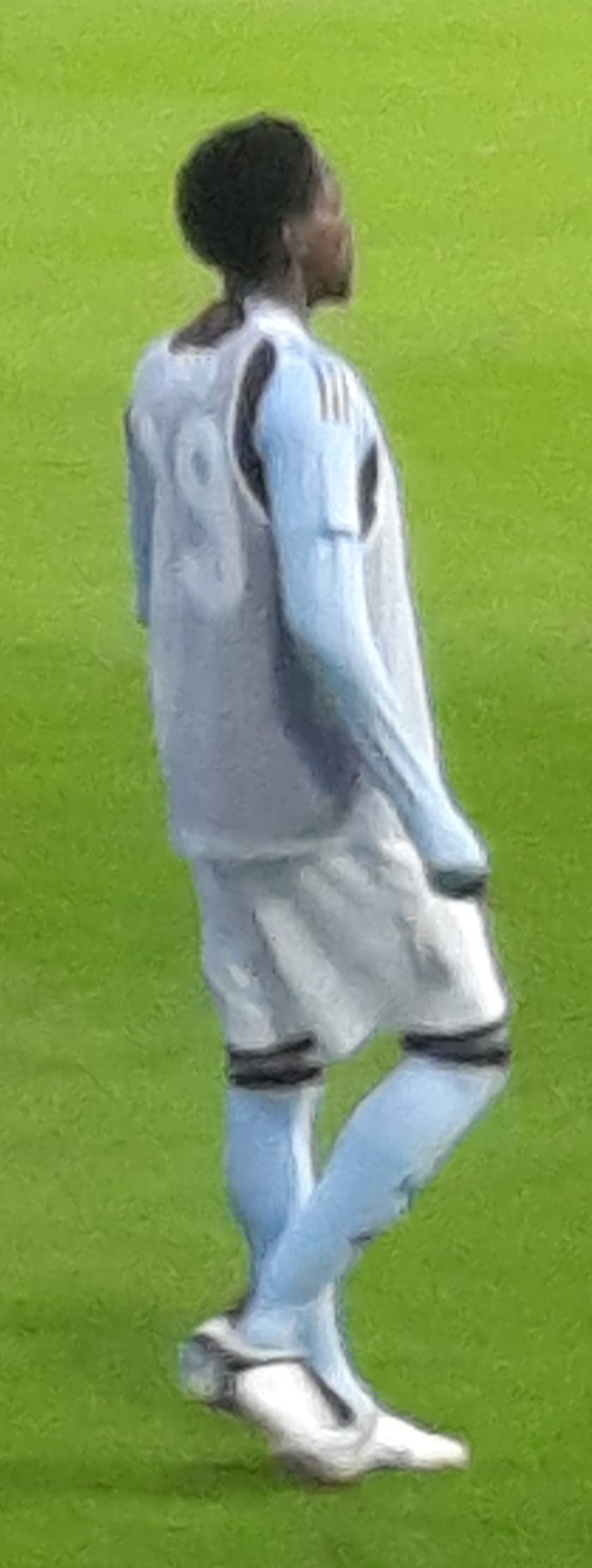
Philogene with Aston Villa in 2024

On 19 July 2024, Philogene rejoined Aston Villa on a five-year contract. Hull City had agreed an £18 million transfer fee with Ipswich Town earlier in the summer which prompted Aston Villa to enact a clause in the original transfer agreement with Hull City that allowed them to match the fee. However, because of a 30% sell-on clause that was also in place, the fee that Aston Villa paid Hull City was closer to £13 million. On 17 August, he made his debut for the club, as a substitute, in a 2–1 win against West Ham United in the league.

On 2 October 2024, Philogene made his UEFA Champions League debut in a 1–0 victory over Bayern Munich. Later that month, on 19 October, he received his first red card in a 3–1 victory away at Fulham, after receiving a second yellow card in the final minutes of injury time.

=== Ipswich Town ===
On 15 January 2025, Philogene signed for fellow Premier League club Ipswich Town for an undisclosed fee, reported to be £20 million, plus add-ons. On 26 February, he netted his first goals for the club in a 3–2 away defeat against Manchester United. Later that year, on 12 September, he scored a hat-trick in a 5–0 victory over Sheffield United.

== International career ==
Born in England, Philogene is of Dominican descent. In November 2020, Philogene was part of a training camp for the England national under-19 team, and played as a substitute in an unofficial match against Derby County U23s, in which he scored a hat-trick.

Philogene made his debut for the England under-20s on 6 September 2021 in a 6–1 victory over Romania at St George's Park.

On 12 October 2023, Philogene made his first appearance for the England under-21s, scoring twice against Serbia in a 2025 UEFA European Under-21 Championship qualifier.

== Career statistics ==
As of match played 2 May 2026

Appearances and goals by club, season and competition
Club	Season	League			FA Cup		EFL Cup		Europe		Other		Total	
Club	Season	Division	Apps	Goals	Apps	Goals	Apps	Goals	Apps	Goals	Apps	Goals	Apps	Goals
Aston Villa U21	2019–20	—			—		—		—		1 (Note: Appearance(s) in EFL Trophy)	0	1	0
Aston Villa U21	2020–21	—			—		—		—		1	0	1	0
Aston Villa U21	2021–22	—			—		—		—		2	2	2	2
Aston Villa U21	Total		—		—		—		—		4	2	4	2
Aston Villa	2020–21	Premier League	1	0	0	0	0	0	—		—		1	0
Aston Villa	2021–22	Premier League	1	0	1	0	2	0	—		—		4	0
Aston Villa	2023–24	Premier League	1	0	—		—		0	0	—		1	0
Aston Villa	Total		3	0	1	0	2	0	0	0	0	0	6	0
Stoke City (loan)	2021–22	Championship	11	1	—		—		—		—		11	1
Cardiff City (loan)	2022–23	Championship	37	4	1	1	1	0	—		—		39	5
Hull City	2023–24	Championship	32	12	0	0	—		—		—		32	12
Aston Villa	2024–25	Premier League	11	0	0	0	1	0	3 (Note: Appearances in UEFA Champions League)	0	—		15	0
Ipswich Town	2024–25	Premier League	10	2	1	1	—		—		—		11	3
Ipswich Town	2025–26	Championship	36	12	1	1	0	0	—		—		37	13
Ipswich Town	Total		46	14	2	2	0	0	—		—		48	16
Career total			140	31	4	3	4	0	3	0	4	2	155	36

== Honours ==
Ipswich Town

- EFL Championship runner-up: 2025–26
