= Rubin Colwill =

Welsh footballer

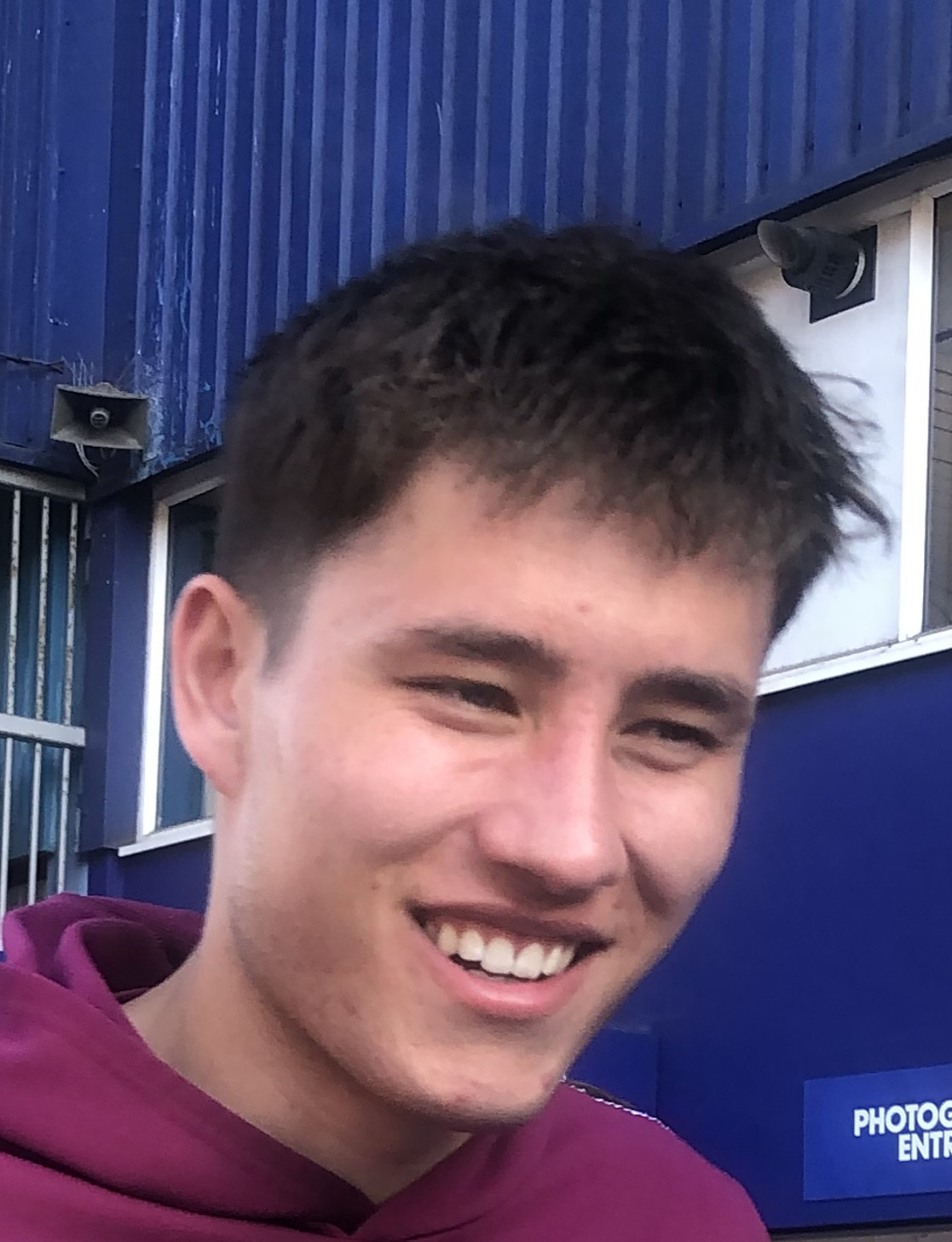
- Rubin Colwill in 2025.

Personal information
- Full name: Rubin James Colwill
- Date of birth: 27 April 2002 (age 24)
- Place of birth: Neath, Wales
- Height: 1.89 m (6 ft 2 in)
- Position: Attacking midfielder

Team information
- Current team: Cardiff City
- Number: 10

Youth career
- 2010–2021: Cardiff City

Senior career*
Years	Team	Apps	(Gls)
2021–	Cardiff City	178	(16)

International career^{‡}
2018	Wales U17	3	(0)
2021–2024	Wales U21	9	(5)
2021–	Wales	12	(1)
- * Club domestic league appearances and goals as of 8 November 2026 (UTC) ‡ National team caps and goals as of 22:11, 17 November 2026 (UTC)

Rubin James Colwill (born 27 April 2002) is a Welsh professional footballer who plays as an attacking midfielder for EFL Championship club Cardiff City and the Wales national team.

== Club career ==
Colwill joined the youth academy of Cardiff City when he was eight. He made his professional debut with the club as a late substitute during a 3–1 EFL Championship win over Coventry City on 13 February 2021. The following day, Colwill signed his first professional contract, alongside Isaak Davies. Colwill's first league start for the club came in a 2–1 win over Wycombe Wanderers on 24 April 2021, earning high praise from manager Mick McCarthy for his performance in the match. On 12 September 2021, Colwill scored his first senior goals, scoring a brace in Cardiff's 2–1 victory against Nottingham Forest. On 6 February 2022, he scored Cardiff's only goal in a 3–1 loss to Liverpool in the FA Cup fourth round.

== International career ==
Colwill made his debut for the Wales national under-17 football team in a 2–2 draw against Belarus on 10 October 2018. He was selected for the Wales under-21 squad for a friendly match against Republic of Ireland on 25 March 2021 and made his debut for the side as a substitute during a 2–1 defeat.

On 30 May 2021, despite having never made an appearance for the senior Wales team, Colwill was selected by Rob Page for Wales' Euro 2020 squad. He made his senior national team debut on 2 June 2021 in a friendly against France, replacing Joe Morrell in the 83rd minute. Colwill scored his first international goal for Wales on 29 March 2022 in a 1–1 friendly match draw against Czech Republic.

In November 2022 he was named in the Wales squad for the 2022 FIFA World Cup in Qatar. He came on as last substitute for injured Joe Allen, in the 81st minute of the third group game against England.

On 8 September 2023 Rubin Colwill played for Wales Under-21 alongside his brother Joel in the 4–0 friendly win against Liechtenstein.

== Personal life ==
Rubin Colwill is the older brother of Wales international footballer and Cardiff City teammate Joel Colwill.

Colwill married long-time girlfriend Angharad Samuel in May 2025.

== Career statistics ==
=== Club ===
As of match played 17 August 2026

Appearances and goals by club, season and competition
Club	Season	League			FA Cup		EFL Cup		Other		Total	
Club	Season	Division	Apps	Goals	Apps	Goals	Apps	Goals	Apps	Goals	Apps	Goals
Cardiff City	2020–21	Championship	6	0	0	0	0	0	—		6	0
Cardiff City	2021–22	Championship	34	5	2	1	2	0	—		38	6
Cardiff City	2022–23	Championship	20	0	1	0	1	0	—		22	0
Cardiff City	2023–24	Championship	36	1	1	0	3	2	—		40	3
Cardiff City	2024–25	Championship	43	1	3	2	2	2	—		48	5
Cardiff City	2025–26	League One	31	8	1	0	4	1	—		36	9
Cardiff City	2026–27	Championship	1	1	0	0	0	0	0	0	1	1
Career total			171	16	8	3	12	5	0	0	191	24

=== International ===
As of match played 17 November 2026

Appearances and goals by national team and year
National team	Year	Apps	Goals
Wales	2021	3	0
Wales	2022	5	1
Wales	2023	0	0
Wales	2024	1	0
Wales	2025	1	0
Wales	2026	2	0
Total		12	1

List of international goals scored by Rubin Colwill
No.	Date	Venue	Opponent	Score	Result	Competition
1	29 March 2022	Cardiff City Stadium, Cardiff, Wales	Czech Republic	1–1	1–1	Friendly
