= Harry Tyler =

Harry Tyler may refer to:

- Harry Walter Tyler (1863–1938), American chemist and university administrator
- Harry Tyler (actor) (1888–1961), American actor in The Case of the Howling Dog and other films
- Harry Tyler, a character in the 1968 film The Lost Continent, played by Tony Beckley
- Harry Nelson Tyler, Atlanta, Georgia architect who worked with Haralson Bleckley

== See also ==
- Henry Tyler (disambiguation)
- Harold Tyler (disambiguation)
- Harrison Tyler (disambiguation)
- Parker Tyler (Harrison Parker Tyler, 1904–1974)
- Harrison and Tyler, feminist comedy duo
- Harry Tyrer (disambiguation)
