= Jak Alnwick =

English footballer (born 1993)

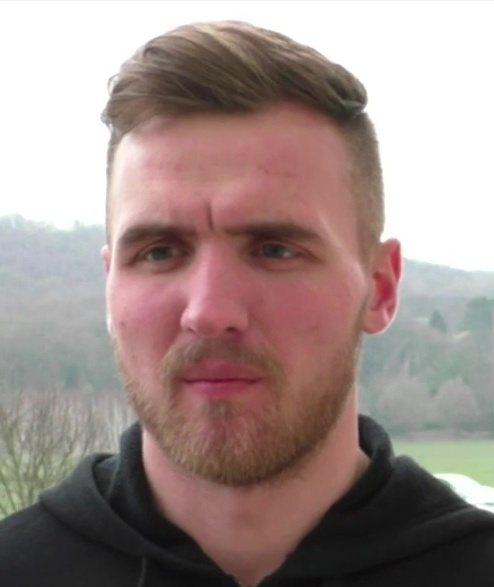
- Alnwick in 2015

Personal information
- Full name: Jak Alnwick
- Date of birth: 17 June 1993 (age 33)
- Place of birth: Hexham, England
- Height: 1.88 m (6 ft 2 in)
- Position: Goalkeeper

Team information
- Current team: Huddersfield Town
- Number: 31

Youth career
- 2005–2008: Sunderland
- 2008–2011: Newcastle United

Senior career*
Years	Team	Apps	(Gls)
2011–2015	Newcastle United	6	(0)
2011–2012	→ Gateshead (loan)	6	(0)
2015	→ Bradford City (loan)	1	(0)
2015–2017	Port Vale	67	(0)
2017–2020	Rangers	6	(0)
2018–2019	→ Scunthorpe United (loan)	41	(0)
2019–2020	→ Blackpool (loan)	22	(0)
2020–2022	St Mirren	67	(0)
2022–2026	Cardiff City	57	(0)
2026–	Huddersfield Town	5	(0)

International career
2008–2009	England U17	4	(0)
2010–2011	England U18	2	(0)
- * Club domestic league appearances and goals as of 1 May 2026 (UTC)

Jak Alnwick (born 17 June 1993) is an English professional footballer who plays as a goalkeeper for EFL League One club Huddersfield Town.

Alnwick turned professional at Newcastle United in 2008 and went on to represent England at under-17 and under-18 levels. He spent time on loan at Gateshead in the 2011–12 season and played six Premier League games for Newcastle in the 2014–15 season. He joined Bradford City on loan in March 2015 and Port Vale on a free transfer that August. He was sold to Rangers for an undisclosed fee in January 2017, though he spent the 2018–19 season on loan at Scunthorpe United after failing to earn a first-team place. He joined Blackpool on loan for the 2019–20 season. He joined St Mirren on a free transfer in June 2020 and spent two years with the club before returning to the English Football League with Cardiff City in May 2022. He joined Huddersfield Town in January 2026.

== Club career ==
=== Newcastle United ===
Alnwick joined Newcastle United from local rivals Sunderland in 2008. He won the Wor Jackie Award for the club's best youth player in 2011.

He was loaned to Conference Premier club Gateshead in September 2011. After a man of the match performance in a 3–2 defeat to Southport at the Gateshead International Stadium on his first-team debut, his initial four-week loan spell was extended until the end of the calendar year by manager Ian Bogie. He made a total of six league and three FA Cup appearances during his loan spell.

Alnwick signed a new two-year contract in July 2013. He made his debut for Newcastle United as a half-time substitute for the injured Rob Elliot in a 2–1 Premier League home win over Chelsea on 6 December 2014 and made five saves throughout the match. Two days later, manager Alan Pardew declared that Alnwick was playing for a new contract with his current deal due to expire in the summer. A week later, in his first full start, Newcastle lost 4–1 to Arsenal at the Emirates Stadium. He made his first League Cup appearance in the quarter-finals at Tottenham Hotspur and spilt a corner while under no pressure, which allowed Nabil Bentaleb to open the scoring in a 4–0 defeat. In his first start at St James' Park, Alnwick conceded in injury time from Sunderland's Adam Johnson as Newcastle lost the Tyne-Wear derby on 21 December. His final Premier League outing of the 2014–15 season came in a 3–3 draw with Burnley on 1 January. Tim Krul returned from injury for Newcastle's trip to Chelsea ten days later.

Alnwick joined League One club Bradford City on loan until the end of the 2014–15 season on 13 March 2015. The following day, he started away to Notts County in a 1–1 draw, but was cup-tied for their defeat by Reading in an FA Cup sixth-round replay on 16 March. In Bradford's next league game, a 2–2 draw with Fleetwood Town at Valley Parade five days later, Alnwick was dropped to the bench as regular goalkeeper Ben Williams returned. On 24 March, Alnwick admitted that his Newcastle career might be over and regretted not getting loaned out earlier on in his career in order prove himself. His season ended in early April as he picked up a wrist injury which required surgery. On 29 May, Newcastle announced that they had opted against offering him a new contract.

=== Port Vale ===
After an unsuccessful trial at Championship side Leeds United, Alnwick joined League One club Port Vale on a five-month contract to cover for the injured Chris Neal on 6 August 2015. He kept a clean sheet on his debut, the opening game of the 2015–16 season, a 0–0 draw with rivals Crewe Alexandra at Gresty Road.> He was praised for a save to deny Sheffield United's Billy Sharp a goal during a 2–1 win at Vale Park on 3 October. He signed a new two-and-a-half-year contract in October 2015. He retained his first-team place upon Neal's recovery from injury, and was named in the English Football League's Team of the Week for "a string of fine saves" in a 2–1 victory over Barnsley on 14 November. His good form led to him being linked with moves to Wigan Athletic and Preston North End in the January transfer window, though he said that he was "over the moon" to stay with Port Vale. A stomach injury he picked up in February caused him to miss four games. He was returned to the starting line-up upon his recovery and went on to pick up the club's Young Player of the Year award, whilst Neal was released.

New manager Bruno Ribeiro appointed Alnwick as joint-captain, along with Ben Purkiss and Anthony Grant, in July 2016. He kept clean sheets in the two opening league games of the 2016–17 season, and was named in the EFL Team of the Week for his performance in the 2–0 win over Southend United on 13 August. He was named in the Team of the Week for a second time following his performance in the 1–0 win over Milton Keynes Dons at Stadium mk on 9 October.> His third appearance in the Team of the Week came following his performance in the 0–0 draw with Oldham Athletic at Boundary Park on 2 January. Later in the month Rangers were reported to have activated Alnwick's £250,000 release clause. Port Vale struggled to find a reliable goalkeeper after Alnwick's departure, using no less than seven goalkeepers in the calendar year following his departure. In December 2019, local newspaper The Sentinel ran a poll of fans to debate Port Vale's best goalkeeper of the 2010s; Alnwick finished in third-place with 26% of the vote, behind Scott Brown (44%) and Chris Neal (30%).

=== Rangers ===
On 30 January 2017, Alnwick signed a three-and-a-half-year contract with Scottish Premiership club Rangers for an undisclosed fee – later reported to be £250,000. Manager Mark Warburton signed him to provide competition for Wes Foderingham. He made his debut for the Ibrox club on the final day of the 2016–17 season, a 2–1 victory over St Johnstone at McDiarmid Park. On 22 October 2017, he conceded two goals in a defeat to Motherwell at Hampden Park in the Scottish League Cup semi-finals and was criticised for an inability to command his area. He was given a first-team place towards the end of the 2017–18 season by manager Graeme Murty amidst rumours that incoming manager Steven Gerrard was looking to re-sign Allan McGregor. He started in the 5–0 defeat to Old Firm rivals Celtic and was credited with keeping the score from being a complete humiliation.

On 30 August 2018, Alnwick joined English League One side Scunthorpe United on loan until the following January. He joined "the Iron", managed by former Rangers player Stuart McCall, after Gerrard selected McGregor as his first-choice goalkeeper, with Wes Foderingham as his back-up. He was named on the EFL team of the week after keeping a clean sheet against Shrewsbury Town on 24 September, helping Scunthorpe to their first home win of the season with a series of "key saves". On 26 January, he kept a clean sheet in a "gritty" 1–0 win over Fleetwood Town at Glanford Park and was again named in the EFL team of the week.

On 23 July 2019, he returned to League One with a season-long loan to Blackpool. Manager Simon Grayson signed him following an Achilles tendon injury to the club's incumbent goalkeeper Mark Howard. However, he injured his arm in a Boxing Day defeat to Accrington Stanley at Bloomfield Road and was sidelined for 12 weeks. Rangers released Alnwick at the end of the 2019–20 season. Grayson offered him a pre-contract deal, but Blackpool withdrew the offer after sacking Grayson.

=== St Mirren ===
On 22 June 2020, Alnwick signed a two-year contract with Scottish Premiership club St Mirren; "Buddies" manager Jim Goodwin said he would be "a very able replacement" for Czech goalkeeper Václav Hladký. He impressed in his second game for the club, making ten key saves to keep the scoreline respectable in a 3–0 defeat at Rangers. St Mirren reached the semi-finals of the Scottish Cup and Scottish League Cup, losing to St Johnstone and Livingston, and only missed Goodwin's target of a top-six league finish due to their inferior goal difference. Alnwick praised reserve goalkeeper Dean Lyness for his hard work during the 2020–21 season, whilst commented on own performances by saying "I'm so pleased to have played so many games this season and showed I can do it on a consistent basis".

He conceded six goals in defeat at Celtic Park on 21 August 2021 and later admitted that he had played poorly in the first half and had his confidence boosted by Celtic goalkeeper Joe Hart at half-time. Speaking in November, Alnwick said he was delaying contract talks until the new year. However, the club faced an outbreak of COVID-19 and struggled for form over the following two months, leaving Alnwick to tell his teammates "to forget about saying the top six.... we need to go and win a game of football" after they went seven games without a victory. Speaking after Alnwick made an impressive performance in a 1–0 win at Hibernian on 5 February, Goodwin said that he was hopeful the goalkeeper would sign a new deal with the club. However, Goodwin left the club to manage Aberdeen later that month and would fail to persuade Alnwick to join him at Pittodrie in the summer. On 19 March, Alnwick was sent off for bringing down Dundee United's Tony Watt during a 2–1 defeat at St Mirren Park. New manager Stephen Robinson agreed a deal to sign Dundee United's veteran goalkeeper Trevor Carson as it became apparent that Alnwick would not be signing a new deal with St Mirren. He made 39 appearances in the 2021–22 campaign, keeping clean sheets in each of his final four matches.

=== Cardiff City ===
On 17 May 2022, he was announced as Championship club Cardiff City's second signing of the summer transfer window, where manager Steve Morison was keen to conduct business early and replace outgoing goalkeeper Alex Smithies; Alnwick agreed a two-year contract. He was sent off on his league debut for the club, during a 2–0 defeat at Preston North End on 11 March; he had only started the game due to a suspension for regular custodian Ryan Allsop. Manager Sabri Lamouchi blamed the defence for putting Alnwick in a bad situation. He ended the 2022–23 season with seven appearances to his name.

He signed a new contract in September 2023 to keep him at the club until the summer of 2025 after starting the 2023–24 campaign as new manager Erol Bulut's first-choice goalkeeper and keeping a clean sheet in the South Wales derby win over Swansea City. He was named in the Championship team of the week following his performance in a 1–0 win at Watford on 3 February. However, he picked up a knee ligament injury and lost his first-team place to new signing Ethan Horvath. He triggered a one-year contract extension in January 2025. He tore his hamstring in a 1–1 draw at Plymouth Argyle on 22 February, which manager Omer Riza confirmed would see him out of action until the end of the 2024–25 season.

Head coach Brian Barry-Murphy revealed that Alnwick was in the North East of England due to personal reasons from October to December 2025. He did not feature for cardiff in the 2025–26 campaign, with Nathan Trott and Matthew Turner above him in the pecking order.

=== Huddersfield Town ===
On 8 January 2026, Alnwick was sold to Huddersfield Town for an undisclosed fee, joining on an 18-month contract to provide manager Lee Grant with cover for Lee Nicholls.

== International career ==
Alnwick was capped by England at under-17 and under-18 level and was named in Brian Eastick's squad for the 2011 FIFA U-20 World Cup in Colombia as back-up to Jack Butland and Lee Nicholls.

== Style of play ==
Alnwick is reported as being an "athletic and powerful" goalkeeper with "quick feet" and reactions, as well as a good distribution skills.

== Personal life ==
Alnwick was born in Hexham and is the younger brother of former Sunderland and England under-21 goalkeeper Ben Alnwick. The pair played against each other in a 1–1 draw between Port Vale and Peterborough United on 17 October 2015.

== Career statistics ==
As of match played 25 April 2025

Appearances and goals by club, season and competition
Club	Season	League			National cup (Note: Includes FA Cup, Scottish Cup)		League cup (Note: Includes Football League Cup, Scottish League Cup)		Other		Total	
Club	Season	Division	Apps	Goals	Apps	Goals	Apps	Goals	Apps	Goals	Apps	Goals
Newcastle United	2011–12	Premier League	0	0	0	0	0	0	—		0	0
Newcastle United	2012–13	Premier League	0	0	0	0	0	0	0	0	0	0
Newcastle United	2013–14	Premier League	0	0	0	0	0	0	—		0	0
Newcastle United	2014–15	Premier League	6	0	1	0	1	0	—		8	0
Newcastle United	Total		6	0	1	0	1	0	0	0	8	0
Gateshead (loan)	2011–12	Conference Premier	6	0	3	0	—		0	0	9	0
Bradford City (loan)	2014–15	League One	1	0	—		—		—		1	0
Port Vale	2015–16	League One	41	0	3	0	2	0	2 (Note: Appearance(s) in the Football League Trophy / EFL Trophy.)	0	48	0
Port Vale	2016–17	League One	26	0	3	0	1	0	1	0	31	0
Port Vale	Total		67	0	6	0	3	0	3	0	79	0
Rangers	2016–17	Scottish Premiership	1	0	0	0	—		—		1	0
Rangers	2017–18	Scottish Premiership	5	0	2	0	3	0	0	0	10	0
Rangers	2018–19	Scottish Premiership	0	0	0	0	0	0	0	0	0	0
Rangers	2019–20	Scottish Premiership	0	0	0	0	0	0	0	0	0	0
Rangers	Total		6	0	2	0	3	0	0	0	11	0
Scunthorpe United (loan)	2018–19	League One	41	0	2	0	—		0	0	43	0
Blackpool (loan)	2019–20	League One	22	0	2	0	0	0	0	0	24	0
St Mirren	2020–21	Scottish Premiership	34	0	4	0	7	0	—		45	0
St Mirren	2021–22	Scottish Premiership	33	0	3	0	3	0	—		39	0
St Mirren	Total		67	0	7	0	10	0	0	0	84	0
Cardiff City	2022–23	Championship	4	0	2	0	1	0	—		7	0
Cardiff City	2023–24	Championship	24	0	1	0	1	0	—		26	0
Cardiff City	2024–25	Championship	29	0	0	0	2	0	—		31	0
Cardiff City	2025–26	League One	0	0	0	0	0	0	0	0	0	0
Cardiff City	Total		57	0	3	0	4	0	0	0	64	0
Huddersfield Town	2025–26	League One	5	0	—		—		1	0	6	0
Huddersfield Town	2026–27	League One	0	0	0	0	0	0	0	0	0	0
Huddersfield Town	Total		0	0	0	0	0	0	0	0	0	0
Career total			278	0	26	0	21	0	4	0	329	0
