= Luey Giles =

Welsh footballer (born 2006)

Personal information
- Full name: Luey Philip Giles
- Date of birth: 4 August 2006 (age 20)
- Place of birth: Cardiff, Wales
- Height: 1.76 m (5 ft 9 in)
- Position: Defender

Team information
- Current team: Kidderminster Harriers (on loan from Cardiff City)
- Number: 3

Youth career
- –2024: Cardiff City

Senior career*
Years	Team	Apps	(Gls)
2024–	Cardiff City	2	(0)
2026	→ Eastleigh (loan)	7	(0)
2026–	→ Kidderminster Harriers (loan)	5	(0)

International career^{‡}
2022–2023	Wales U17	12	(0)
2023–2025	Wales U19	13	(1)
2025–	Wales U21	3	(0)
- * Club domestic league appearances and goals as of 14:58, 2 October 2026 (UTC) ‡ National team caps and goals as of 14:58, 2 October 2026 (UTC)

Luey Philip Giles (born 4 August 2006) is a Welsh professional footballer who plays as a defender for National League club Kidderminster Harriers on loan from EFL Championship club Cardiff City. He is a Wales under-21 international.

== Early and personal life ==
Giles is from Ely, Cardiff.

== Career ==
Giles joined the academy of Cardiff City at under-9s level.

On 20 April 2024, Giles made his senior debut for Cardiff City, coming off of the bench to assist fellow youngster Cian Ashford's last-minute winner over high-flying Southampton. His appearance made him the tenth-youngest player to represent the club in the league, the club having to rush to find a shirt that did not include gambling sponsors. Following the conclusion of the 2023–24 season, he was one of twelve youngsters to sign a professional contract.

On 3 January 2026, Giles joined National League club Eastleigh on loan for the remainder of the 2025-26 season. On 1 September 2026 Giles joined National League club Kidderminster Harriers on loan for the remainder of the 2026-27 season.

== International career ==
In October 2023, Giles received a first international call-up for the Wales U19 squad having previously represented the under-17 team.

== Career statistics ==
As of match played 2 December 2026

Appearances and goals by club, season and competition
Club	Season	League			FA Cup		League Cup		Other		Total	
Club	Season	Division	Apps	Goals	Apps	Goals	Apps	Goals	Apps	Goals	Apps	Goals
Cardiff City	2023–24	Championship	2	0	0	0	0	0	—		2	0
Cardiff City	2024–25	Championship	0	0	2	0	1	0	—		3	0
Cardiff City	2025–26	League One	0	0	0	0	0	0	2 (Note: Appearance(s) in EFL Trophy)	1	2	1
Career total			2	0	2	0	1	0	2	1	7	1
