= Isaak Davies =

Welsh footballer

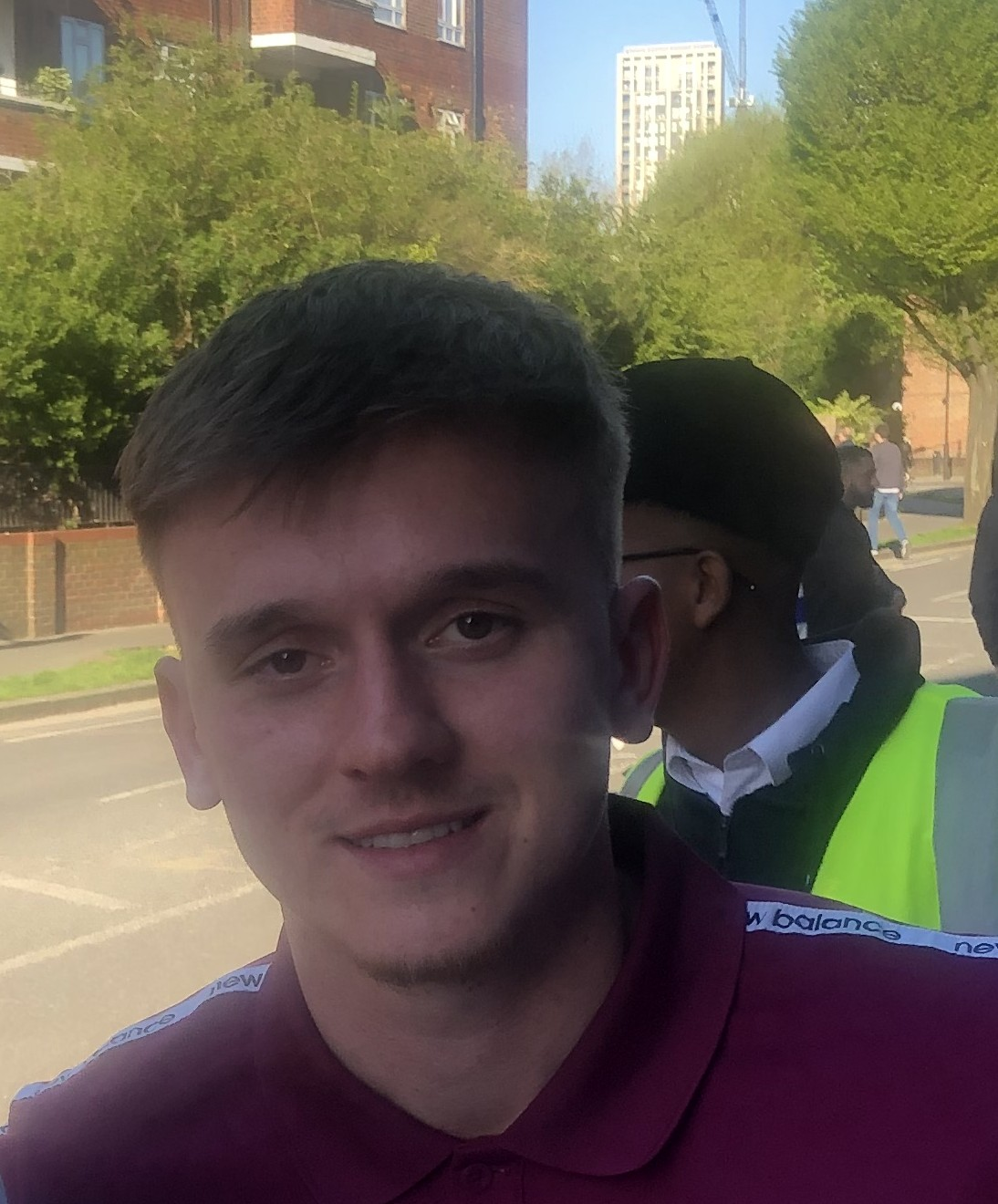
- Davies in 2025

Personal information
- Full name: Isaak James Davies
- Date of birth: 25 September 2001 (age 25)
- Place of birth: Aberdare, Wales
- Height: 1.75 m (5 ft 9 in)
- Position: Forward

Team information
- Current team: Cardiff City
- Number: 39

Youth career
- 2008–2021: Cardiff City

Senior career*
Years	Team	Apps	(Gls)
2021–	Cardiff City	84	(10)
2023–2024	→ Kortrijk (loan)	34	(12)

International career^{‡}
2017	Wales U17	3	(1)
2018–2019	Wales U19	5	(2)
2020	Wales U20	1	(0)
2021–2022	Wales U21	5	(0)
2025–	Wales	2	(0)
- * Club domestic league appearances and goals as of 09:43, 25 October 2026 (UTC) ‡ National team caps and goals as of 11:09, 2 June 2026 (UTC)

Isaak James Davies (born 25 September 2001) is a Welsh professional footballer who plays as a forward for EFL Championship club Cardiff City and the Wales national team.

== Club career ==
Davies signed for Cardiff City at the age of 7. He signed his first professional contract in February 2021, alongside Rubin Colwill. He made his first-team debut for Cardiff City on 23 October 2021 against Middlesbrough. He assisted Kieffer Moore in Cardiff City's 2–1 win over Huddersfield Town on 6 November 2021. Davies scored his first senior goal on 9 January 2022, scoring the first in Cardiff's 2–1 FA Cup victory over Preston North End. He signed a further contract in March 2022. In August 2022, Cardiff rejected a transfer bid for Davies from Burnley.

In August 2023 he signed on loan for Belgian club Kortrijk. He signed a new contract with Cardiff in March 2024, following a "successful" loan spell in Belgium, where he was Kortrijk's Player of the Season.

Ahead of the 2024–25 season, Cardiff manager Erol Bulut said that Davies would be an "active" player for the club, but Davies suffered a hamstring injury in pre-season, being ruled out for an estimated 4 months. He returned to training in October 2024, but in November, Cardiff manager Omer Riza said Davies would be out-of-action until January 2025. He made his return on 22 February 2025, as a late substitute.

== International career ==
Davies represented Wales at youth international level.

On 6 October 2025 Davies was called up to the Wales senior squad for the first time, as an injury replacement for Daniel James. Davies made his senior debut for Wales on 18 November 2025 in the World Cup qualifier 7-1 win against North Macedonia.

== Career statistics ==
As of match played 24 October 2026

Appearances and goals by club, season and competition
Club	Season	League			National cup (Note: Includes FA Cup, Belgian Cup)		League cup (Note: Includes EFL Cup)		Other		Total	
Club	Season	Division	Apps	Goals	Apps	Goals	Apps	Goals	Apps	Goals	Apps	Goals
Cardiff City	2021–22	Championship	28	2	2	1	0	0	—		30	3
Cardiff City	2022–23	Championship	10	1	2	0	0	0	—		12	1
Cardiff City	2023–24	Championship	0	0	0	0	0	0	—		0	0
Cardiff City	2024–25	Championship	9	2	1	0	0	0	—		10	2
Cardiff City	2025–26	League One	29	5	1	0	5	1	1 (Note: Appearance in the EFL Trophy)	0	36	6
Cardiff City	2026–27	Championship	8	0	0	0	2	0	—		10	0
Cardiff City	Total		84	10	6	1	7	1	1	0	98	12
Kortrijk (loan)	2023–24	Belgian Pro League	34	12	2	0	—		—		36	12
Career total			118	22	8	1	7	1	1	0	134	24
