= Harold Tyler =

Harold Tyler may refer to:

- Harold R. Tyler Jr. (1922–2005), United States federal judge
- Harold I. Tyler (1901–1967), American businessman and politician from New York

== See also ==
- Harry Tyler (disambiguation)
- Harrison Tyler (disambiguation)
