= Ronan Kpakio =

Welsh footballer (born 2007)

Personal information
- Full name: Ronan Sahr Kpakio
- Date of birth: 25 May 2007 (age 19)
- Place of birth: Cardiff, Wales
- Height: 5 ft 10 in (1.78 m)
- Position: Defender

Team information
- Current team: Cardiff City
- Number: 44

Youth career
- 2015–2024: Cardiff City

Senior career*
Years	Team	Apps	(Gls)
2024–	Cardiff City	45	(2)

International career^{‡}
2022	Wales U16	5	(0)
2022–2024	Wales U17	13	(1)
2024	Wales U18	3	(0)
2024	Wales U19	5	(0)
2026–	Wales U21	2	(0)
2025–	Wales	4	(0)
- * Club domestic league appearances and goals as of 8 November 2026 (UTC) ‡ National team caps and goals as of 21:31, 8 October 2026 (UTC)

Ronan Sahr Kpakio (born 25 May 2007) is a Welsh footballer who plays as a defender for EFL Championship club Cardiff City and the Wales national team.

== Club career ==
Kpakio joined Cardiff City aged eight, signing a first professional contract in July 2024.

Ahead of the 2024–25 season, Kpakio featured for the first-team during pre-season, particularly impressing during a 7–1 thrashing of Penybont where he registered two assists. On 13 August 2024, he was handed a senior professional debut, playing the duration of an EFL Cup First Round victory over Bristol Rovers. In December 2024, he made his Championship debut as a second-half substitute in a 2–0 defeat to Sheffield United due to a number of injuries in the right-back area of the squad.

He scored his first goal for Cardiff in the EFL League One opener against Peterborough United on 2 August 2025.

On 22 September 2025, Kpakio signed a new contract with the Bluebirds, running until the summer of 2029. He became a first-team regular in the 2025–26 season.

== International career ==
After earning caps at youth level for Wales, Kpakio was given a place in the senior team squad by manager Craig Bellamy, aged just 18, ahead of the national side's FIFA World Cup qualification games against Liechtenstein and Belgium in June 2025. At the time of his call-up, Kpakio had made just six senior professional appearances.

Kpakio made his senior international debut in a 1–0 friendly defeat to Canada in Swansea on 9 September 2025. He started the game and played seventy minutes before being replaced by Sorba Thomas.

== Personal life ==
Born in Wales, Kpakio is of Zimbabwean descent.

== Career statistics ==
As of match played 12 September 2026

Appearances and goals by club, season and competition
Club	Season	League			FA Cup		League Cup		Other		Total	
Club	Season	Division	Apps	Goals	Apps	Goals	Apps	Goals	Apps	Goals	Apps	Goals
Cardiff City	2024–25	Championship	3	0	1	0	2	0	—		6	0
Cardiff City	2025–26	League One	33	2	1	0	3	0	1 (Note: Appearance in EFL Trophy)	0	38	2
Cardiff City	2026–27	Championship	3	0	0	0	2	0	—		5	0
Career total			39	2	2	0	7	0	1	0	49	2

=== International ===
As of match played 6 June 2026

Appearances and goals by national team and year
National team	Year	Apps	Goals
Wales	2025	3	0
Wales	2026	1	0
Total		4	0
