= Joel Colwill =

Welsh footballer

Personal information
- Full name: Joel William Colwill
- Date of birth: 27 October 2004 (age 22)
- Place of birth: Neath, Wales
- Height: 1.78 m (5 ft 10 in)
- Position: Attacking midfielder

Team information
- Current team: Cardiff City
- Number: 27

Youth career
- –2023: Cardiff City

Senior career*
Years	Team	Apps	(Gls)
2023–	Cardiff City	56	(6)
2024–2025	→ Cheltenham Town (loan)	22	(6)
2025	→ Exeter City (loan)	18	(0)

International career^{‡}
2019	Wales U16	2	(0)
2022	Wales U18	4	(0)
2022	Wales U19	3	(1)
2023–	Wales U21	7	(0)
2025–	Wales	4	(0)
- * Club domestic league appearances and goals as of 8 November 2026 (UTC) ‡ National team caps and goals as of 22:26, 4 October 2026 (UTC)

Joel William Colwill (born 27 October 2004) is a Welsh professional footballer who plays as an attacking midfielder for EFL Championship club Cardiff City and the Wales national team.

== Club career ==
Colwill is a product of the Cardiff City academy, signing his first professional contract with Cardiff in June 2022. In August 2023, Colwill made his senior debut for Cardiff City in the EFL Cup against Colchester United. Colwill signed a new five-year contract with Cardiff City in September 2023.

On 2 August 2024, Colwill joined League Two club Cheltenham Town on an initial season-long loan deal. Having impressed over the first-half of the season, it was announced on 10 January 2025 that Colwill would be recalled from his loan at Cheltenham. On 12 January 2025, Colwill was signed by League One club Exeter City on loan until the end of the season.

== International career ==
Joel Colwill made his Wales under-21 debut on 8 September 2023 in the 4–0 friendly win against Liechtenstein alongside his brother Rubin. In September 2025, he was called up to the Wales senior squad for the first time.

He made his Wales senior debut in a 1–0 friendly defeat to Canada on 9 September 2025.

== Career statistics ==
As of match played 19 September 2026

Appearances and goals by club, season and competition
Club	Season	League			FA Cup		League Cup		Other		Total	
Club	Season	Division	Apps	Goals	Apps	Goals	Apps	Goals	Apps	Goals	Apps	Goals
Cardiff City	2023–24	Championship	2	0	1	0	2	0	0	0	5	0
Cardiff City	2024–25	Championship	0	0	0	0	0	0	0	0	0	0
Cardiff City	2025–26	League One	39	5	1	0	5	2	1 (Note: Appearance(s) in EFL Trophy)	0	46	7
Cardiff City	2026–27	Championship	8	1	0	0	2	0	0	0	10	1
Cardiff City	Total		49	6	2	0	9	2	1	0	61	8
Cheltenham Town (loan)	2024–25	League Two	22	6	2	2	1	0	3	1	28	9
Exeter City (loan)	2024–25	League One	18	0	–		–		–		18	0
Career total			89	12	4	2	10	2	4	1	107	17

=== International ===
As of match played 4 October 2026

Appearances and goals by national team and year
National team	Year	Apps	Goals
Wales	2025	1	0
Wales	2026	3	0
Total		4	0

== Personal life ==
Joel Colwill is the younger brother of Wales international footballer and Cardiff City teammate Rubin Colwill.

== Honours ==
Cheltenham Town Young Player of the Year (2024/25)
