= Dakarai Mafico =

Welsh footballer (born 2006)

Personal information
- Full name: Dakarai Asante Mafico
- Date of birth: 7 December 2006 (age 19)
- Place of birth: Wales
- Position: Midfielder

Team information
- Current team: Cardiff City
- Number: 28

Youth career
- 2015–2025: Cardiff City

Senior career*
Years	Team	Apps	(Gls)
2025–	Cardiff City	1	(0)
2026	→ Yeovil Town (loan)	12	(0)

International career^{‡}
2025–	Wales U21	1	(0)
- * Club domestic league appearances and goals as of 21:13, 30 May 2026 (UTC) ‡ National team caps and goals as of 16:53, 14 November 2025 (UTC)

Dakarai Asante Mafico (born 7 December 2006) is a Welsh professional footballer who plays as a midfielder for EFL Championship club Cardiff City. He is a Wales under-21 international.

== Club career ==
Mafico signed his first professional contract with Cardiff City in July 2024 having previously playing for the Cardiff under-18 and under-21 teams.

He made his senior Cardiff debut on 16 August 2025 in the starting line-up for the 3–0 EFL League One win against Rotherham United.

On 9 January 2026, Mafico joined National League club Yeovil Town on loan until the end of the 2025–26 season.

== International career ==
Born in Wales, Mafico is of Zimbabwean descent. He was called up to the Wales under-21 squad for the first time in October 2025. He made his debut on 14 November 2025 in the 3–0 defeat to Belgium under-21.

== Career statistics ==
As of end of 2025–26 season

Appearances and goals by club, season and competition
Club	Season	League			FA Cup		EFL Cup		Other		Total	
Club	Season	Division	Apps	Goals	Apps	Goals	Apps	Goals	Apps	Goals	Apps	Goals
Cardiff City	2025–26	League One	1	0	0	0	1	0	2 (Note: Appearances in EFL Trophy)	0	4	0
Yeovil Town (loan)	2025–26	National League	12	0	—		—		3 (Note: Appearances in FA Trophy)	0	15	0
Career total			13	0	0	0	1	0	5	0	19	0
