= 2025–26 Cardiff City F.C. season =

Welsh football club season

Cardiff City
2025–26 season
- Owner: Vincent Tan
- Chairman: Mehmet Dalman
- Head coach: Brian Barry-Murphy
- Stadium: Cardiff City Stadium
- League One: 2nd (promoted)
- FA Cup: First round
- EFL Cup: Quarter-finals
- EFL Trophy: Round of 32
- Top goalscorer: League: Yousef Salech (14); All: Yousef Salech (15)
- Highest home attendance: 33,027 v Chelsea (16 Dec 2025, EFL Cup)
- Lowest home attendance: 2,107 v AFC Wimbledon (2 Dec 2025, EFL Trophy)
- Average home league attendance: 19,583
- Biggest win: 4–0 v Plymouth Argyle (Home, 30 Aug 2025, League One); 4–0 v Barnsley (Home, 27 Jan 2026, League One); 0–4 v Doncaster Rovers (Away, 28 Feb 2026, League One); 0–4 v Exeter City (Away, 14 Mar 2026, League One); 5–1 v Northampton Town (Home, 25 Apr 2026, League One)
- Biggest defeat: 1–5 v AFC Wimbledon (Home, 2 Dec 2025, EFL Trophy)
- All statistics correct as of 2 May 2026.

The 2025–26 season was the 127th season in the history of Cardiff City Football Club and their first season back in League One, the third tier of English football, since the 2002–03 season following relegation from the Championship in the previous season. In addition to the domestic league, the club also participated in the FA Cup, the EFL Cup, and the EFL Trophy.

Prior to the season starting, Brian Barry-Murphy was appointed as Head Coach on a three-year contract.

== Transfers ==
=== In ===
Date	Pos.	Player	From	Fee	Ref.
3 July 2025	CM	(Scotland) Matthew Apter	(England) Everton	Free	
3 July 2025	CB	(England) Gabriel Keita	(England) Norwich City	Free	
3 July 2025	CB	(Republic of Ireland) Charlie O'Brien	(England) Queens Park Rangers	Free	
29 August 2025	CB	(Scotland) Jack Kingdon	(England) Manchester United	Free	
29 August 2025	CB	(Nigeria) Gabriel Osho	(France) Auxerre	Undisclosed	
16 January 2026	GK	(England) Harry Tyrer	(England) Everton	Undisclosed	
21 January 2026	CB	(England) Caden Voice	(England) Wolverhampton Wanderers	Free Transfer	
2 February 2026	CAM	(Wales) Isaac Davies	(England) Nottingham Forest	Undisclosed	
2 February 2026	RW	(England) Herbie James	(England) Tottenham Hotspur	Undisclosed	

=== Out ===
Date	Pos.	Player	To	Fee	Ref.
4 July 2025	LW	(Republic of Ireland) Callum O'Dowda	(Hungary) Ferencváros	Undisclosed	
5 August 2025	CB	(Japan) Ryotaro Tsunoda	(Japan) Yokohama F. Marinos	Undisclosed	
8 January 2026	GK	(England) Jak Alnwick	(England) Huddersfield Town	Undisclosed	
22 January 2026	LW	(Wales) Isaac Jefferies	(Wales) The New Saints	Undisclosed	
29 January 2026	GK	(United States) Ethan Horvath	(United States) New York Red Bulls	Free Transfer	

=== Loaned in ===
Date	Pos.	Player	From	Date until	Ref.
6 August 2025	GK	(England) Nathan Trott	(Denmark) Copenhagen	31 May 2026	
1 September 2025	CAM	(England) Omari Kellyman	(England) Chelsea	31 May 2026	
1 February 2026	LB	(England) Calum Scanlon	(England) Liverpool	31 May 2026	

=== Loaned out ===
Date	Pos.	Player	To	Date until	Ref.
27 June 2025	CF	(England) Michael Reindorf	(Wales) Newport County	3 February 2026 (Note: On 3 February, Reindorf was recalled from his season-long loan at Newport County and subsequently joined Tamworth on loan)	
28 June 2025	CF	(Croatia) Roko Šimić	(Germany) Karlsruher SC	31 May 2026	
1 August 2025	CF	(England) Kion Etete	(England) Rotherham United	15 January 2026 (Note: On 15 January, Etete's initial season-long loan at Rotherham United was terminated)	
22 August 2025	GK	(United States) Ethan Horvath	(England) Sheffield Wednesday	2 January 2026	
30 August 2025	CB	(Norway) Jesper Daland	(Germany) Fortuna Düsseldorf	31 May 2026	
1 September 2025	CF	(Wales) Isaac Jefferies	(Wales) The New Saints	10 January 2026	
1 September 2025	CF	(Wales) Morgan Wigley	(Wales) Barry Town United	10 January 2026	
21 October 2025	RB	(Wales) Will Spiers	(Wales) Merthyr Town	31 December 2025	
3 January 2026	LB	(Wales) Luey Giles	(England) Eastleigh	31 May 2026	
3 January 2026	RB	(Wales) Will Spiers	(England) Eastleigh	9 February 2026 (Note: On 9 February, Spiers was recalled from his loan at Eastleigh and subsequently joined Merthyr Town on loan)	
9 January 2026	CDM	(Wales) Dakarai Mafico	(England) Yeovil Town	31 May 2026	
12 January 2026	CM	(Wales) Troy Perrett	(England) Yeovil Town	31 May 2026	
14 January 2026	CF	(Wales) Tanatswa Nyakuhwa	(Wales) Newport County	31 May 2026	
21 January 2026	CF	(England) Kion Etete	(Scotland) St Mirren	31 May 2026	
3 February 2026	CF	(England) Michael Reindorf	(England) Tamworth	31 May 2026	
4 February 2026	GK	(Wales) Ewan Griffiths	(Wales) Cardiff Metropolitan University	31 May 2026	
9 February 2026	RB	(Wales) Will Spiers	(Wales) Merthyr Town	31 May 2026	
13 February 2026	GK	(Wales) Jake Dennis	(Wales) Merthyr Town	17 March 2026 (Note: On 17 March, Dennis was recalled from his short-term loan at Merthyr Town)	
17 March 2026	LB	(Wales) Jac Thomas	(Wales) Merthyr Town	31 May 2026	

=== Released / out of contract ===
Date	Pos.	Player	Subsequent club	Join date	Ref.
30 June 2025	AM	(Wales) Kieron Evans	(England) Eastleigh	1 July 2025	
30 June 2025	CB	(Greece) Dimitrios Goutas	(Turkey) Gençlerbirliği	3 July 2025	
30 June 2025	CM	(Wales) Aaron Ramsey	(Mexico) UNAM	3 July 2025	
30 June 2025	GK	(Wales) Joe Thomas	(Wales) Barry Town	4 July 2025	
30 June 2025	CB	(England) Freddie Cook	(England) A.F.C.Telford United	8 August 2025	
30 June 2025	RW	(Wales) Cole Fleming	(England) Chippenham Town	8 August 2025	
30 June 2025	CM	(England) Raheem Conte	(England) Morecambe	20 August 2025	
30 June 2025	CF	(Ivory Coast) Yakou Méïté	(Saudi Arabia) Damac	27 August 2025	
30 June 2025	RW	(Netherlands) Anwar El Ghazi	(Qatar) Al-Sailiya SC	10 September 2025	
30 June 2025	LB	(Nigeria) Jamilu Collins	(Germany) Erzgebirge Aue	26 September 2025	
30 June 2025	CM	(England) Joe Ralls	(England) Plymouth Argyle	5 November 2025	
30 June 2025	CM	(Zimbabwe) Andy Rinomhota	(England) Reading	12 November 2025	
30 June 2025	CM	(England) Adeteye Gbadehan	(United States) St. Louis City 2	13 March 2026	
30 June 2025	LW	(England) Baylin Johnson			

=== New contract ===
Date	Pos.	Player	Contract until	Ref.
2 July 2025	CAM	(Wales) Jake Davies	Undisclosed (Note: First professional contract)	
2 July 2025	CB	(Wales) Alyas Debono	Undisclosed	
2 July 2025	CF	(Wales) Daniel Ola	Undisclosed	
2 July 2025	LB	(Wales) Jac Thomas	Undisclosed	
3 July 2025	CF	(Wales) Isaac Jefferies	Undisclosed	
31 July 2025	LW	(Wales) Mannie Barton	Undisclosed	
5 August 2025	RW	(England) Ollie Tanner	30 June 2029	
27 August 2025	CB	(Wales) Dylan Lawlor	30 June 2028	
22 September 2025	CF	(Wales) Isaak Davies	30 June 2029	
22 September 2025	RB	(Wales) Ronan Kpakio	30 June 2029	
30 October 2025	CDM	(Wales) Eli King	30 June 2027	
7 November 2025	GK	(Wales) Matthew Turner	30 June 2028	
10 December 2025	GK	(Wales) Luke Armstrong	30 June 2028	
20 January 2026	CF	(Denmark) Yousef Salech	30 June 2030	
2 March 2026	RW	(Wales) Cian Ashford	30 June 2030	
16 March 2026	CAM	(Wales) Rubin Colwill	30 June 2030	

== Current squad ==
As of 2 May 2026

Note: Flags indicate national team as has been defined under FIFA eligibility rules. Players may hold more than one non-FIFA nationality.

No.	Name	Nat.	Position(s)	Date of birth (age)	Apps.	Goals	Year signed	Signed from	Transfer fee	Ends
Goalkeepers
13	Nathan Trott	(England) (Bermuda)	GK	21 November 1998 (age 27)	46	0	2025	(Denmark) Copenhagen	Loan	2026
30	Harry Tyrer	(England)	GK	6 December 2001 (age 24)	2	0	2026	(England) Everton	Undisclosed	2029
41	Matthew Turner	(Wales)	GK	27 March 2002 (age 24)	9	0	2021	(England) Leeds United	Free	2028
Defenders
2	Will Fish	(England)	CB	17 February 2003 (age 23)	69	2	2024	(England) Manchester United	Undisclosed	2028
3	Joel Bagan	(Republic of Ireland) (England)	LB	3 September 2001 (age 25)	130	4	2020	Academy	Trainee	2026
4	Gabriel Osho	(Nigeria) (England)	CB/RB	14 August 1998 (age 28)	22	0	2025	(France) Auxerre	Undisclosed	2029
12	Calum Chambers	(England)	CB/RB/DM	20 January 1995 (age 31)	73	5	2024	(England) Aston Villa	Free	2027
23	Calum Scanlon	(England)	LB	14 February 2005 (age 21)	8	0	2026	(England) Liverpool	Loan	2026
38	Perry Ng	(England) (Singapore)	RB/LB/CB	27 April 1996 (age 30)	223	15	2021	(England) Crewe Alexandra	£350,000	2026
44	Ronan Kpakio	(Wales)	RB	25 May 2007 (age 19)	44	2	2024	Academy	Trainee	2029
48	Dylan Lawlor	(Wales)	CB	1 January 2006 (age 20)	39	2	2024	Academy	Trainee	2028
Midfielders
6	Ryan Wintle	(England)	DM/CM/CB	13 June 1997 (age 29)	162	6	2021	(England) Crewe Alexandra	Free	2026
8	Omari Kellyman	(England)	AM/RW/CF	15 September 2005 (age 21)	42	11	2025	(England) Chelsea	Loan	2026
10	Rubin Colwill	(Wales)	AM/LW/RW	27 April 2002 (age 24)	189	23	2020	Academy	Trainee	2027
14	David Turnbull	(Scotland)	AM	10 July 1999 (age 27)	84	4	2024	(Scotland) Celtic	Undisclosed	2027
18	Alex Robertson	(Australia) (Scotland)	CM/AMDM	17 April 2003 (age 23)	76	10	2024	(England) Manchester City	Undisclosed	2028
24	Eli King	(England)	DM/CM	23 December 2002 (age 23)	10	0	2021	Academy	Trainee	2027
27	Joel Colwill	(Wales)	CM	27 October 2004 (age 22)	50	6	2022	Academy	Trainee	2028
Forwards
11	Ollie Tanner	(England)	RW/LW	13 May 2002 (age 24)	100	7	2022	(England) Lewes	£50,000	2029
16	Chris Willock	(England)	LW/RW/AM	31 January 1998 (age 28)	82	10	2024	(England) Queens Park Rangers	Free	2027
22	Yousef Salech	(Denmark) (Jordan)	CF	17 January 2002 (age 24)	63	24	2025	(Sweden) IK Sirius	Undisclosed	2030
39	Isaak Davies	(Wales)	CF/SS/RW	25 September 2001 (age 25)	88	12	2020	Academy	Trainee	2029
45	Cian Ashford	(Wales)	AM/RW/LW	24 September 2004 (age 22)	84	9	2022	Academy	Trainee	2030
47	Callum Robinson	(Republic of Ireland)	CF/LW/RW	2 February 1995 (age 31)	129	33	2022	(England) West Bromwich Albion	£1,500,000	2027
Out on Loan
5	Jesper Daland	(Norway)	CB	6 January 2000 (age 26)	23	0	2024	(Belgium) Cercle Brugge	Undisclosed	2028
28	Dakarai Mafico	(Wales)	CM	7 December 2006 (age 19)	4	0	2025	Academy	Trainee	
29	Tanatswa Nyakuhwa	(Wales)	LW	17 September 2005 (age 21)	9	0	2024	Academy	Trainee	
	Kion Etete	(England) (Nigeria)	CF/SS	28 November 2001 (age 24)	62	9	2022	(England) Tottenham Hotspur	£500,000	2027
	Roko Šimić	(Croatia) (Italy)	CF	10 September 2003 (age 23)	0	0	2024	(Austria) FC Red Bull Salzburg	Undisclosed	2028
	Michael Reindorf	(England)	CF	10 May 2005 (age 21)	4	0	2024	(England) Norwich City	Free	Undisclosed

== Pre-season and friendlies ==
On 6 June, Cardiff City announced as part of their pre-season preparations the squad would travel to Murcia for a warm-weather training camp. Six days later, two friendlies were confirmed, against Yeovil Town and Cambridge United. A further two friendlies against Queens Park Rangers and Notts County were later added. On 30 June, friendlies against Johor Darul Ta'zim and Southend United were added to the Spain training camp.

Win Draw Loss Fixtures

9 July 2025 Friendly	Cardiff City	2–2	Johor Darul Ta'zim	San Pedro del Pinatar, Spain
19:00 CEST	Turnbull 48'; R. Colwill 62'	Report		Stadium: Pinatar Arena

12 July 2025 Friendly	Cardiff City	3–0	Southend United	San Pedro del Pinatar, Spain
19:00 CEST	Salech 24', 38'; J. Colwill 80'	Report		Stadium: Pinatar Arena

18 July 2025 Friendly	Cardiff City	5–1	Cambridge United	Vale of Glamorgan
13:00 BST	Davies; Robinson; Willock; Salech; Ashford	Report	Lavery	Stadium: Cardiff City Training Ground; Attendance: 0 (Behind-closed-doors)

23 July 2025 Friendly	Queens Park Rangers	2–2	Cardiff City	Hounslow
14:00 BST	Dembélé 35'; Pearman 72'	Report	Robinson 8'; R. Colwill 15'	Stadium: TSG Training Centre; Attendance: 0 (Behind-closed-doors)

26 July 2025 Friendly	Notts County	2–2	Cardiff City	Nottingham
15:00 BST	Cotter 52'; Jatta 82'	Report	Salech 38'; Robinson 78'	Stadium: Meadow Lane

== Competitions ==
=== Overall record ===
Competition	First match	Last match	Starting round	Final position	Record							
Competition	First match	Last match	Starting round	Final position	Pld	W	D	L	GF	GA	GD	Win %
EFL League One	2 August 2025	2 May 2026	Matchday 1	Second	46	27	10	9	90	50	+40	58.70
FA Cup	1 November 2025	1 November 2025	First round	First round	1	0	0	1	0	1	−1	0.00
EFL Cup	12 August 2025	16 December 2025	First round	Quarter Final	5	4	0	1	10	6	+4	80.00
EFL Trophy	September 2025	2 December 2025	Group stage	Round of 32	4	2	0	2	5	7	−2	50.00
Total					56	33	10	13	105	64	+41	58.93

Last updated: 2 May 2026
Source: Soccerway

=== League One ===
==== League table ====
Pos	Team	Pld	W	D	L	GF	GA	GD	Pts	Promotion, qualification or relegation
1	Lincoln City (C, P)	46	31	10	5	89	41	+48	103	Promotion to EFL Championship
2	Cardiff City (P)	46	27	10	9	90	50	+40	91	Promotion to EFL Championship
3	Stockport County	46	22	11	13	71	58	+13	77	Qualification for League One play-offs
4	Bradford City	46	22	11	13	58	51	+7	77	Qualification for League One play-offs
5	Bolton Wanderers (O, P)	46	19	18	9	70	52	+18	75	Qualification for League One play-offs

Source: EFL Official Website
Rules for classification: 1) Points; 2) Goal difference; 3) Number of goals scored; 4) Head-to-head results; 5) Wins; 6) Away goals; 7) Penalty points (sec 9.5); 8) 12-point sending off offences
(C) Champions; (O) Play-off winners; (P) Promoted

==== Results summary ====
Overall								Home						Away					
Pld	W	D	L	GF	GA	GD	Pts	W	D	L	GF	GA	GD	W	D	L	GF	GA	GD
46	27	10	9	90	50	+40	91	17	2	4	50	23	+27	10	8	5	40	27	+13

Last updated: 2 May 2026.
Source: Soccerway

==== Results by round ====
Round	1	2	3	4	5	6	8	9	10	7^{1}	11	13	14	15	16	17	18	16^{3}	19	21	22	23	24	25	26	27	28	29	30	31	32	33	34	35	36	12^{2}	37	38	39	42	43	40^{4}	44	41^{5}	45	46
Ground	H	A	H	A	A	H	A	H	A	H	H	H	A	A	A	H	H	A	H	A	H	H	A	H	A	A	H	H	A	A	H	H	A	A	H	A	A	H	H	A	H	A	A	H	H	A
Result	W	D	W	W	W	W	D	L	W	L	W	W	L	L	W	W	W	W	W	L	W	W	D	W	D	W	D	W	D	W	W	W	L	W	L	D	W	L	D	D	W	D	W	W	W	L
Position	9	8	2	2	1	1	1	4	4	4	3	1	3	4	1	1	1	1	1	1	1	1	1	1	1	1	1	1	1	1	1	1	1	1	2	2	2	2	2	2	2	2	2	2	2	2
Points	3	4	7	10	13	16	17	17	20	20	23	26	26	26	29	32	35	38	41	41	44	47	48	51	52	55	56	59	60	63	66	69	69	72	72	73	76	76	77	78	81	82	85	88	91	91

Source: EFL
A = Away; H = Home; W = Win; D = Draw; L = Loss; P = Postponed
Notes:
- ^{1} Matchday 7 (vs. Burton Albion) was postponed due to international call-ups.
- ^{2} Matchday 12 (vs. Barnsley) was postponed due to international call-ups.
- ^{3} Matchday 16 (vs. Huddersfield Town) was postponed due to international call-ups.
- ^{4} Matchday 40 (vs. Huddersfield Town) was postponed due to international call-ups.
- ^{5} Matchday 41 (vs. Port Vale) was postponed because of Port Vale's FA Cup tie.

==== Matches ====
Win Draw Loss Fixtures

2 August 2025 1	Cardiff City	2–1	Peterborough United	Cardiff
12:30 BST	Lawlor (yellow card) 24'; R. Colwill 48'; Tanner (yellow card) 53'; Kpakio 60'; Bagan (yellow card) 67'	BBC report Cardiff City report Sky report	Ihionvien 33' (pen.); Mills (yellow card) 85'	Stadium: Cardiff City Stadium; Attendance: 19,615; Referee: Benjamin Speedie

7 August 2025 2	Port Vale	0–0	Cardiff City	Stoke-on-Trent
20:00 BST	Clark (yellow card) 54'; Ojo (yellow card) 90+4'	BBC report Sky report	Bagan (yellow card) 54'	Stadium: Vale Park; Attendance: 9,791; Referee: Tom Reeves
Note: Fixture was originally scheduled for 9 August, but was moved live Sky Sports broadcasting.

16 August 2025 3	Cardiff City	3–0	Rotherham United	Cardiff
15:00 BST	Mafico (yellow card) 32'; Salech 43'; Bagan (yellow card) 51'; Ashford 55'; R. Colwill 60'	BBC report Sky report	Martha (yellow card) 22'; Agbaire (yellow card) 38'; Raggett (yellow card) 68'	Stadium: Cardiff City Stadium; Attendance: 17,555; Referee: Thomas Parsons

19 August 2025 4	AFC Wimbledon	0–1	Cardiff City	Wimbledon
19:45 BST	Stevens (yellow card) 34'; Browne (yellow card) 90+4'	BBC report Sky report	Salech (yellow card) 40'; Lawlor (yellow card) 71'; Davies 90+2'	Stadium: Plough Lane; Attendance: 8,452; Referee: David Rock

23 August 2025 5	Luton Town	0–1	Cardiff City	Luton
12:30 BST	Keeley (yellow card) 52'; Saville (yellow card) 55'	BBC report Sky report Club report	Willock 68'; Chambers (yellow card) 86'	Stadium: Kenilworth Road; Attendance: 11,456; Referee: Martin Coy
Note: Fixture was originally scheduled for a 15:00 kick-off, but was moved live Sky Sports broadcasting.

30 August 2025 6	Cardiff City	4–0	Plymouth Argyle	Cardiff
12:30 BST	J. Colwill (yellow card) 34'; Wintle 41'; R. Colwill (yellow card) 42', (goal) 50'; Willock 44'; Kpakio (yellow card) 90'; Davies 90+1'	BBC report Sky report	Sorinola (yellow card) 21'	Stadium: Cardiff City Stadium; Attendance: 21,813; Referee: Scott Oldham
Note: Fixture was originally scheduled for a 15:00 kick-off, but was moved live Sky Sports broadcasting.

13 September 2025 8	Stockport County	1–1	Cardiff City	Stockport
15:00 BST	Norwood 34' (pen.)	BBC report Sky report	Ng (yellow card) 40'; Salech 90+6'	Stadium: Edgeley Park; Attendance: 9,956; Referee: Simon Mather

20 September 2025 9	Cardiff City	1–3	Bradford City	Cardiff
15:00 BST	Robinson 77'	BBC report Sky report	Leigh 16'; Sarcevic 30' (pen.); Neufville 49'	Stadium: Cardiff City Stadium; Attendance: 22,132; Referee: Martin Woods

27 September 2025 10	Wigan Athletic	0–2	Cardiff City	Wigan
15:00 BST	Smith (yellow card) 33'; Fox (red card) 90+5'	BBC report Sky report	Ng 17'; Salech 90+6' (pen.)	Stadium: Brick Community Stadium; Referee: Darren Drysdale

30 September 2025 7	Cardiff City	0–1	Burton Albion	Cardiff
19:45 BST	Kpakio (yellow card) 90+1'; Salech (yellow card) 90+5'	BBC Report; Sky report	McKiernan (yellow card) 21'; Evans (yellow card) 38'; Revan (yellow card) 69'; Webster 82'; Godwin-Malife (yellow card) 90+11'	Stadium: Cardiff City Stadium; Attendance: 15,814; Referee: Jacob Miles
Note: Fixture was originally scheduled for 6 September, but was postponed due to international call-ups.

4 October 2025 11	Cardiff City	4–3	Leyton Orient	Cardiff
15:00 BST	Robinson 20', 71'; Kpakio (yellow card) 30'; Lawlor 52'; Willock (yellow card) 57'; Salech 69'	BBC report Sky report	Connolly 29', (yellow card) 78'; El Mizouni 54'; Clare (yellow card) 57'; Ballard 61'	Stadium: Cardiff City Stadium; Attendance: 18,528; Referee: Matthew Corlett

18 October 2025 13	Cardiff City	2–1	Reading	Cardiff
15:00 BST	Kellyman 49'; Salech 65'	BBC report Sky report	Wing 38'	Stadium: Cardiff City Stadium; Attendance: 20,363; Referee: Lee Swabey

25 October 2025 14	Bolton Wanderers	1–0	Cardiff City	Bolton
12:30 BST	Osei-Tutu (yellow card) 89'; Sheehan (yellow card) 90+2'; Cozier-Duberry 90+4'	BBC report Sky report	Ng (yellow card) 41'	Stadium: Toughsheet Community Stadium; Attendance: 22,587; Referee: Ben Toner
Note: Fixture was originally scheduled for a 15:00 kick-off, but was rescheduled for live Sky Sports broadcasting.

8 November 2025 15	Blackpool	3–1	Cardiff City	Blackpool
15:00 GMT	Ihiekwe (yellow card) 45+1'; Fletcher 47', 69'; Bloxham 81'; Ashworth (yellow card) 85'	BBC report Sky report	R. Colwill (yellow card) 45+1'; Chambers (yellow card) 79'; Salech 90+8'	Stadium: Bloomfield Road; Attendance: 10,792; Referee: Bobby Madley

22 November 2025 17	Northampton Town	1–3	Cardiff City	Northampton
15:00 GMT	Wheatley 57'	BBC report Sky report	J. Colwill 7'; Wheatley 60' (o.g.); Willock 90+3'	Stadium: Sixfields Stadium; Attendance: 7,151; Referee: Neil Hair

29 November 2025 18	Cardiff City	3–0	Mansfield Town	Cardiff
15:00 GMT	Fish 34'; Salech 40'; Ashford 87'	BBC report Sky report		Stadium: Cardiff City Stadium; Attendance: 18,174; Referee: Ben Atkinson

6 December 2025 16	Cardiff City	3–2	Huddersfield Town	Cardiff
12:30 GMT	Salech 6', 62'; Davies 86'	BBC report Sky report	Castledine 51'; Taylor 89'	Stadium: Cardiff City Stadium; Attendance: 16,048; Referee: Elliot Bell
Note: Live on Sky Sports+. Fixture was originally scheduled for 15 November, but was postponed due to international call-ups.

9 December 2025 19	Stevenage	0–1	Cardiff City	Stevenage
19:45 GMT	Piergianni (yellow card) 40'; Goode (yellow card) 45'; Phillips (yellow card) 75'; Doherty (yellow card) 76'	BBC report Sky report	Chambers (yellow card) 82'; Robinson 85'	Stadium: Lamex Stadium; Attendance: 4,428; Referee: James Oldham
Note: Live on Sky Sports+. Kick Off was delayed until 8pm following bad weather.

13 December 2025 20	Cardiff City	4–3	Doncaster Rovers	Leckwith
15:00 GMT	Kellyman 25'; Ashford 34'; Salech 50'; Robertson (yellow card) 57'; Wintle (yellow card) 82'; Bagan 90+9'	BBC report Sky report	Bailey 15', (yellow card) 76'; Hanlan 42'; Close (yellow card) 59'; Clifton 72'	Stadium: Cardiff City Stadium; Attendance: 18,934; Referee: Alex Chilowicz

20 December 2025 21	Lincoln City	2–1	Cardiff City	Lincoln
15:00 GMT	Robertson 40' (o.g.); Bradley 67'	BBC report Sky report	Ng 49'	Stadium: Sincil Bank; Attendance: 9,913; Referee: Richard Eley

26 December 2025 22	Cardiff City	1–0	Exeter City	Cardiff
15:00 GMT	Robertson 53'	BBC report Sky report		Stadium: Cardiff City Stadium; Attendance: 22,291; Referee: Tom Reeves
Note: Live on Sky Sports+.

29 December 2025 23	Cardiff City	2–1	Stevenage	Cardiff
19:45 GMT	Robinson 64'; Salech 82'	BBC report Sky report	Patterson 57'	Stadium: Cardiff City Stadium; Attendance: 19,678; Referee: Charles Breakspear

1 January 2026 24	Wycombe Wanderers	1–1	Cardiff City	High Wycombe
15:00 GMT	Boyd-Munce 30'	BBC report Sky report	Willock 6'	Stadium: Adams Park; Attendance: 7,364; Referee: Alan Young
Note: Live on Sky Sports

4 January 2026 25	Cardiff City	1–0	Wigan Athletic	Cardiff
15:00 GMT	Chambers 24'	BBC report Sky report Club report		Stadium: Cardiff City Stadium; Attendance: 18,174; Referee: Will Finnie

10 January 2026 26	Leyton Orient	1–1	Cardiff City	Leyton
15:00 GMT	Ballard 12'	BBC report Sky report	Salech 33'	Stadium: Brisbane Road; Attendance: 8,423; Referee: Scott Oldham

17 January 2026 27	Bradford City	1–2	Cardiff City	Bradford
12:30 GMT	Metcalfe 59'	BBC report Sky report	Turnbull 14'; Chambers 24'	Stadium: Valley Parade; Attendance: 21,571; Referee: David Rock
Note: Fixture was initially scheduled for a 15:00 kick-off, but was rescheduled for live Sky Sports broadcasting.

24 January 2026 28	Cardiff City	1–1	Stockport County	Leckwith
12:30 GMT	J Colwill 45+7'	BBC report Sky report	Wootton 10'	Stadium: Cardiff City Stadium; Attendance: 19,684; Referee: Paul Howard
Note: Fixture was initially scheduled for a 15:00 kick-off, but was rescheduled for live Sky Sports broadcasting.

27 January 2026 29	Cardiff City	4–0	Barnsley	Leckwith
19:45 GMT	Perry Ng 3'; Robertson (yellow card) 5'; Willock 45+1', 69'; Kellyman 63'	BBC report Sky report	O'Connell (yellow card) 17'; O'Keeffe (yellow card) 87'	Stadium: Cardiff City Stadium; Attendance: 17,841; Referee: Lee Swabey
Note: Live on Sky Sports+

31 January 2026 30	Burton Albion	2–2	Cardiff City	Burton upon Trent
15:00 GMT	Beesley 11'; Lofthouse 78'	BBC report Sky report	Robertson 46', 63'	Stadium: Pirelli Stadium; Attendance: 4,864; Referee: Martin Coy

7 February 2026 31	Rotherham United	0–3	Cardiff City	Rotherham
15:00 GMT		BBC report Sky report	Wintle (red card) 21'; Kellyman 43'; Willock 58'; Davies 90+5'	Stadium: New York Stadium; Attendance: 8,786; Referee: Seb Stockbridge

14 February 2026 32	Cardiff City	3–1	Luton Town	Leckwith
15:00 GMT	Turnbull 11', (yellow card) 13'; Bagan (yellow card) 18'; J Colwill 37'; Ng 42'; Trott (yellow card) 64'	BBC report Sky report Club report	Clark 20' (pen.); Lonwijk (yellow card) 45+1'; Palmer (yellow card) 76'	Stadium: Cardiff City Stadium; Attendance: 19,524; Referee: Oliver Yates

17 February 2026 33	Cardiff City	4–1	AFC Wimbledon	Leckwith
19:45 GMT	J Colwill 22'; Ng 58'; Tanner 61'; Kellyman 87'	BBC report Sky report	Stevens 45+1'	Stadium: Cardiff City Stadium; Attendance: 18,028; Referee: Simon Mather

21 February 2026 34	Plymouth Argyle	5–2	Cardiff City	Plymouth
12:30 GMT	Tolaj 28', 68' (pen.); Pepple 31', 34'; Watts (yellow card) 37'; Ross (yellow card) 44', (goal) 81'; Boateng (yellow card) 70'	BBC report Club report Sky report	Kellyman (yellow card) 15', (goal) 33', 43'; Osho (yellow card) 45+6'; Ng (yellow card) 67'; Robertson (yellow card) 72'	Stadium: Home Park; Attendance: 16,713; Referee: Darren Drysdale
Note: Fixture was initially scheduled for a 15:00 kick-off, but was rescheduled for live Sky Sports broadcasting.

28 February 2026 35	Doncaster Rovers	0–4	Cardiff City	Doncaster
15:00 GMT		BBC report Sky report	Robertson 26'; Lawlor 46'; Ashford 56'; Robinson 90+5'	Stadium: Eco-Power Stadium; Attendance: 11,618; Referee: Edward Duckworth

7 March 2026 36	Cardiff City	0–2	Lincoln City	Leckwith
12:30 GMT		BBC report Sky report	Street 55'; Jefferies 73'	Stadium: Cardiff City Stadium; Attendance: 27,280; Referee: Tom Reeves
Note: Fixture was originally scheduled for a 15:00 kick-off, but was moved for an earlier time for live Sky Sports broadcasting.

10 March 2026 12	Barnsley	1–1	Cardiff City	Barnsley
19:45 GMT	Banks 22'	BBC report Sky report	R. Colwill 11'	Stadium: Oakwell; Attendance: 9,677; Referee: Will Finnie
Note: Live on Sky Sports+. Fixture was originally scheduled for 11 October, but was postponed due to international call-ups.

14 March 2026 37	Exeter City	0–4	Cardiff City	Exeter
15:00 GMT		BBC report Sky report	R. Colwill 31', 34'; Robertson 67'; Robinson 86'	Stadium: St James Park; Attendance: 7,180; Referee: Benjamin Speedie

17 March 2026 38	Cardiff City	0–2	Wycombe Wanderers	Leckwith
19:45 GMT	Osho (red card) 43'	BBC report Sky report	Vidigal 79'; Woodrow 84'	Stadium: Cardiff City Stadium; Attendance: 16,663; Referee: Carl Brook
Note: Live on Sky Sports+

21 March 2026 39	Cardiff City	0–0	Blackpool	Leckwith
12:30 GMT		BBC report Sky report		Stadium: Cardiff City Stadium; Attendance: 18,026; Referee: Stephen Parkinson
Note: Fixture was initially scheduled for a 15:00 kick-off, but was brought forward for Sky Sports broadcasting.

6 April 2026 42	Peterborough United	1–1	Cardiff City	Peterborough
15:00 BST	Leonard 49'	BBC report Sky report	Robertson 48'	Stadium: London Road Stadium; Attendance: 9,350; Referee: Thomas Parsons
Note: Live on Sky Sports+

11 April 2026 43	Cardiff City	2–0	Bolton Wanderers	Leckwith
12:30 BST	Kellyman 50'; Willock 52'	BBC report Sky report		Stadium: Cardiff City Stadium; Attendance: 21,640; Referee: Elliot Bell
Note: Live on Sky Sports+

14 April 2026 40	Huddersfield Town	1–1	Cardiff City	Huddersfield
19:45 BST	Ledson 27'	BBC report Sky report	Salech 90+5'	Stadium: Accu Stadium; Referee: Andrew Humphries
Note: Live on Sky Sports+. Fixture was initially scheduled for 28 March, but was rearranged due to international call-ups.

18 April 2026 44	Reading	1–3	Cardiff City	Reading
15:00 BST	Kyerewaa 73'	BBC report Sky report	R Colwill 40'; Kellyman 55'; Ng 86'	Stadium: Select Car Leasing Stadium; Attendance: 13,938; Referee: Matthew Corlett

22 April 2026 41	Cardiff City	1–0	Port Vale	Leckwith
19:45 BST	R Colwill 79'	BBC report Sky report		Stadium: Cardiff City Stadium; Attendance: 18,950; Referee: David Rock
Note: Live on Sky Sports+. Fixture was postponed due to Port Vale's FA Cup quarter-final involvements.

25 April 2026 45	Cardiff City	5–1	Northampton Town	Leckwith
15:00 BST	Tanner 9', 54'; J Colwill 19'; Robinson 37'; Salech 85'	Sky report	Evans 68'	Stadium: Cardiff City Stadium; Attendance: 23,223; Referee: Edward Duckworth

2 May 2026 46	Mansfield Town	5–4	Cardiff City	Mansfield
15:00 BST	Sweeney 2'; Akins 23', 26'; Oates 63'; Irow 79'	BBC report Sky report	Davies 61'; Kellyman 66', 90+3'; Kpakio 86'	Stadium: One Call Stadium; Attendance: 9,401; Referee: Charles Breakspear
Note: Live on Sky Sports+

=== FA Cup ===
Cardiff were drawn away to Peterborough United in the first round.

Win Draw Loss Fixtures

1 November 2025 First round	Peterborough United	1–0	Cardiff City	Peterborough
15:00 GMT	Leonard 38'; Mills (yellow card) 79'; Khela (yellow card) 87'	BBC report Sky report		Stadium: London Road Stadium; Attendance: 4,405; Referee: Seb Stockbridge

=== EFL Cup ===
Cardiff were drawn at home to Swindon Town in the first round, Cheltenham Town in the second round, then away to Burnley in the third round, Wrexham in the fourth round and then back at home to Chelsea in the quarter-finals.

Win Draw Loss Fixtures

12 August 2025 First round	Cardiff City	2–1	Swindon Town	Cardiff
19:45 BST	Ashford 21'; R. Colwill 45+2'	BBC report Sky report	Ehibhatiomhan 55'	Stadium: Cardiff City Stadium; Attendance: 7,160; Referee: Elliot Bell

26 August 2025 Second round	Cardiff City	3–0	Cheltenham Town	Cardiff
19:45 BST	Davies 11'; Robinson (yellow card) 26'; Chambers 32'; J. Colwill 51'; Ng (yellow card) 56'	BBC report Sky report	Angol (yellow card) 45+3'; Mažionis (yellow card) 90+1'	Stadium: Cardiff City Stadium; Attendance: 6,233; Referee: Edward Duckworth
Note: Live on Sky Sports+

23 September 2025 Third round	Burnley	1–2	Cardiff City	Burnley
19:45 BST	Ugochukwu (yellow card) 23'; Edwards (yellow card) 34'; Flemming 56'	BBC Report; Sky report	J. Colwill 30'; Robinson 35'; Wintle (yellow card) 67'	Stadium: Turf Moor; Attendance: 6,010; Referee: David Webb
Note: Live on Sky Sports+

28 October 2025 Fourth round	Wrexham	1–2	Cardiff City	Wrexham
20:00 GMT	Moore 52'	BBC Report; Sky report	Salech 13'; Bagan (yellow card) 54'; Kpakio (yellow card) 56'; Fish 71'; Robertson (yellow card) 90+2'	Stadium: Racecourse Ground; Attendance: 10,563; Referee: Gavin Ward
Note: Live on ITV and Sky Sports

16 December 2025 Quarter-finals	Cardiff City	1–3	Chelsea	Cardiff
20:00 GMT	Davies (yellow card) 16'; Chambers (yellow card) 27'; Turnbull 75'	BBC Report; Sky report	Caicedo (yellow card) 45'; Garnacho 57', 90+3'; Neto 82'	Stadium: Cardiff City Stadium; Attendance: 33,027; Referee: Tony Harrington
Note: Broadcast live on Sky Sports

=== EFL Trophy ===
Cardiff were drawn against Exeter City, Newport County and Arsenal U21 in the group stage. By winning the group, City were drawn at home to AFC Wimbledon in the round of 32.

Pos	Div	Team	Pld	W	PW	PL	L	GF	GA	GD	Pts	Qualification
1	L1	Cardiff City	3	2	0	0	1	4	2	+2	6	Advance to Round 2
2	L1	Exeter City	3	2	0	0	1	5	4	+1	6	Advance to Round 2
3	L2	Newport County	3	1	0	0	2	2	3	−1	3	
4	ACA	Arsenal U21	3	1	0	0	2	6	8	−2	3	

Source: EFL

Win Draw Loss Fixtures

16 September 2025 South Group A	Exeter City	0–1	Cardiff City	Exeter
19:00 BST	Fitzwater (yellow card) 86'; Sweeney (yellow card) 89'	BBC Report; Sky report	Robinson 54'; Kpakio (yellow card) 74'; Turnbull (yellow card) 90+4'; Ashford (yellow card) 89' (yellow-red card) 90+5'	Stadium: St James Park; Attendance: 2,152; Referee: Robert Massey-Ellis
Note: Live on Sky Sports+

7 October 2025 South Group A	Cardiff City	0–1	Newport County	Leckwith
19:45 BST	Turnbull (yellow card) 42'; Wintle (yellow card) 45+4'; Parfitt (yellow card) 62'	BBC Report; Sky report	Davies 43'; Antwi (yellow card) 54'; Wright (yellow card) 76'; Evans (yellow card) 79'	Stadium: Cardiff City Stadium; Attendance: 8,505; Referee: Ollie Yates
Note: Live on Sky Sports+

11 November 2025 South Group A	Cardiff City	3–1	Arsenal U21	Leckwith
19:45 GMT	Twose (yellow card) 17'; Perrett 19'; Debono (yellow card) 50'; J. Davies (yellow card) 58'; Spier 67'; George 90+4'	BBC report Sky report	Washington 17'; Copley (yellow card) 39'; Rojas (red card) 59'; Sweet (yellow card) 90+2'	Stadium: Cardiff City Stadium; Attendance: 3,040; Referee: Richie Watkins
Note: Live on Sky Sports+

2 December 2025 Round of 32	Cardiff City	1–5	AFC Wimbledon	Leckwith
19:00 GMT	Giles 88'	BBC report Sky report	Sasu 29', 46', 54', 76'; Bugiel 49'	Stadium: Cardiff City Stadium; Attendance: 2,107; Referee: Abigail Byrne
Note: Live on Sky Sports+

== Statistics ==
=== Appearances and goals ===
Players with no appearances are not included on the list; italics indicate a loaned in player

No.	Pos	Nat	Player	Total		League One		FA Cup		EFL Cup		EFL Trophy	
No.	Pos	Nat	Player	Apps	Goals	Apps	Goals	Apps	Goals	Apps	Goals	Apps	Goals
2	DF	(England) ENG	Will Fish	45	2	28+10	1	1+0	0	3+2	1	1+0	0
3	DF	(Republic of Ireland) IRL	Joel Bagan	52	1	41+4	1	1+0	0	5+0	0	0+1	0
4	DF	(Nigeria) NGR	Gabriel Osho	22	0	17+2	0	0+0	0	0+1	0	2+0	0
5	DF	(Norway) NOR	Jesper Daland	1	0	0+1	0	0+0	0	0+0	0	0+0	0
6	MF	(England) ENG	Ryan Wintle	46	1	38+2	1	0+1	0	4+0	0	1+0	0
8	MF	(England) ENG	Omari Kellyman	42	11	26+10	11	1+0	0	1+1	0	3+0	0
10	MF	(Wales) WAL	Rubin Colwill	36	9	28+3	8	1+0	0	3+1	1	0+0	0
11	MF	(England) ENG	Ollie Tanner	29	3	25+3	3	0+0	0	0+1	0	0+0	0
12	DF	(England) ENG	Calum Chambers	29	3	18+5	2	0+0	0	5+0	1	1+0	0
13	GK	(England) ENG	Nathan Trott	46	0	41+0	0	1+0	0	4+0	0	0+0	0
14	MF	(Scotland) SCO	David Turnbull	48	3	16+25	2	1+0	0	2+2	1	2+0	0
16	FW	(England) ENG	Chris Willock	46	8	27+14	8	0+0	0	0+4	0	0+1	0
18	MF	(Australia) AUS	Alex Robertson	37	6	27+7	6	1+0	0	0+2	0	0+0	0
22	FW	(Denmark) DEN	Yousef Salech	40	15	26+7	14	0+1	0	2+3	1	1+0	0
23	DF	(England) ENG	Calum Scanlon	8	0	2+6	0	0+0	0	0+0	0	0+0	0
24	MF	(Wales) WAL	Eli King	2	0	0+1	0	0+0	0	0+1	0	0+0	0
27	MF	(Wales) WAL	Joel Colwill	46	7	23+16	5	0+1	0	4+1	2	1+0	0
28	MF	(Wales) WAL	Dakarai Mafico	4	0	1+0	0	0+0	0	1+0	0	2+0	0
29	FW	(Wales) WAL	Tanatswa Nyakuhwa	9	0	0+4	0	0+1	0	1+1	0	2+0	0
30	GK	(England) ENG	Harry Tyrer	2	0	2+0	0	0+0	0	0+0	0	0+0	0
31	FW	(Wales) WAL	Axel Donczew	2	0	0+0	0	0+0	0	0+0	0	0+2	0
38	DF	(England) ENG	Perry Ng	40	6	30+5	6	0+0	0	3+1	0	1+0	0
39	FW	(Wales) WAL	Isaak Davies	36	6	8+21	5	0+1	0	4+1	1	1+0	0
41	GK	(Wales) WAL	Matthew Turner	8	0	3+0	0	0+0	0	1+0	0	4+0	0
44	DF	(Wales) WAL	Ronan Kpakio	38	2	18+15	2	1+0	0	2+1	0	0+1	0
45	MF	(Wales) WAL	Cian Ashford	44	5	23+13	4	1+0	0	4+1	1	1+1	0
46	FW	(Republic of Ireland) IRL	Luke Pearce	1	0	0+0	0	0+0	0	0+0	0	0+1	0
47	FW	(Republic of Ireland) IRL	Callum Robinson	47	10	8+32	8	1+0	0	4+0	1	1+1	1
48	DF	(Wales) WAL	Dylan Lawlor	37	2	27+5	2	1+0	0	2+0	0	2+0	0
49	DF	(Wales) WAL	Luey Giles	3	1	0+0	0	0+0	0	0+1	0	2+0	1
50	DF	(England) ENG	Gabriel Keita	1	0	0+0	0	0+0	0	0+0	0	1+0	0
52	MF	(Wales) WAL	Troy Perrett	4	1	0+0	0	0+0	0	0+0	0	3+1	1
55	MF	(Wales) WAL	Rob Tankiewicz	2	0	0+1	0	0+0	0	0+0	0	1+0	0
56	DF	(Wales) WAL	Will Spiers	2	1	0+0	0	0+0	0	0+0	0	2+0	1
57	DF	(Scotland) SCO	Jack Kingdon	3	0	0+0	0	0+0	0	0+0	0	2+1	0
58	DF	(Wales) WAL	T-Jay Parfitt	3	0	0+0	0	0+0	0	0+0	0	2+1	0
59	MF	(England) ENG	Matthew Apter	1	0	0+0	0	0+0	0	0+0	0	1+0	0
60	DF	(Wales) WAL	Alyas Debono	1	0	0+0	0	0+0	0	0+0	0	1+0	0
61	MF	(Wales) WAL	Cody Twose	1	0	0+0	0	0+0	0	0+0	0	1+0	0
62	MF	(Wales) WAL	Trey George	2	1	0+0	0	0+0	0	0+0	0	1+1	1
63	MF	(Wales) WAL	Jake Davies	1	0	0+0	0	0+0	0	0+0	0	0+1	0
64	FW	(Wales) WAL	Daniel Ola	1	0	0+0	0	0+0	0	0+0	0	1+0	0
66	FW	(Republic of Ireland) IRL	Luke Pearce	1	0	0+0	0	0+0	0	0+0	0	0+1	0
69	FW	(Wales) WAL	Jack Sykes	1	0	0+0	0	0+0	0	0+0	0	0+1	0
70	DF	(Wales) WAL	Noah Williams	2	0	0+1	0	0+0	0	0+0	0	0+1	0
71	MF	(Wales) WAL	Paul Moreno	1	0	0+1	0	0+0	0	0+0	0	0+0	0

=== Goals record ===
Rank	No.	Nat.	Pos.	Name	League One	FA Cup	EFL Cup	EFL Trophy	Total
1	22	(Denmark)	FW	Yousef Salech	14	0	1	0	15
2	8	(England)	MF	Omari Kellyman	11	0	0	0	11
3	47	(Republic of Ireland)	FW	Callum Robinson	8	0	1	1	10
4	10	(Wales)	MF	Rubin Colwill	8	0	1	0	9
5	16	(England)	MF	Chris Willock	8	0	0	0	8
6	27	(Wales)	MF	Joel Colwill	5	0	2	0	7
7	18	(Australia)	MF	Alex Robertson	6	0	0	0	6
7	38	(England)	DF	Perry Ng	6	0	0	0	6
7	39	(Wales)	FW	Isaak Davies	5	0	1	0	6
10	45	(Wales)	MF	Cian Ashford	4	0	1	0	5
11	11	(England)	FW	Ollie Tanner	3	0	0	0	3
11	12	(England)	DF	Calum Chambers	2	0	1	0	3
11	14	(Scotland)	MF	David Turnbull	2	0	1	0	3
14	2	(England)	DF	Will Fish	1	0	1	0	2
14	44	(Wales)	DF	Ronan Kpakio	2	0	0	0	2
14	48	(Wales)	DF	Dylan Lawlor	2	0	0	0	2
17	3	(Republic of Ireland)	DF	Joel Bagan	1	0	0	0	1
17	6	(England)	MF	Ryan Wintle	1	0	0	0	1
17	49	(Wales)	DF	Luey Giles	0	0	0	1	1
17	52	(Wales)	MF	Troy Perrett	0	0	0	1	1
17	56	(Wales)	MF	Will Spiers	0	0	0	1	1
17	62	(Wales)	MF	Trey George	0	0	0	1	1
17	Own goals				1	0	0	0	1
Total					90	0	10	5	105

=== Assists record ===
Rank	No.	Nat.	Pos.	Name	League One	FA Cup	EFL Cup	EFL Trophy	Total
1	11	(England)	MF	Ollie Tanner	12	0	0	0	12
2	10	(Wales)	MF	Rubin Colwill	6	0	2	0	8
3	6	(England)	MF	Ryan Wintle	7	0	0	0	7
3	16	(England)	FW	Chris Willock	7	0	0	0	7
5	3	(Republic of Ireland)	DF	Joel Bagan	5	0	1	0	6
5	44	(Wales)	DF	Ronan Kpakio	6	0	0	0	6
7	38	(England)	DF	Perry Ng	4	0	1	0	5
8	14	(Scotland)	MF	David Turnbull	4	0	0	0	4
8	22	(Denmark)	FW	Yousef Salech	4	0	0	0	4
8	45	(Wales)	FW	Cian Ashford	3	0	0	1	4
11	18	(Australia)	MF	Alex Robertson	3	0	0	0	3
11	39	(Wales)	FW	Isaak Davies	2	0	1	0	3
11	47	(Republic of Ireland)	FW	Callum Robinson	3	0	0	0	3
14	8	(England)	MF	Omari Kellyman	2	0	0	0	2
14	27	(Wales)	MF	Joel Colwill	2	0	0	0	2
14	48	(Wales)	DF	Dylan Lawlor	2	0	0	0	2
17	12	(England)	DF	Calum Chambers	0	0	1	0	1
17	28	(Wales)	MF	Dakarai Mafico	0	0	1	0	1
17	61	(Wales)	MF	Cody Twose	0	0	0	1	1
17	64	(Wales)	FW	Daniel Ola	0	0	0	1	1
Total					72	0	7	3	82

=== Disciplinary record ===
Rank	No.	Nat.	Pos.	Name	League One			FA Cup			EFL Cup			EFL Trophy			Total		
Rank	No.	Nat.	Pos.	Name	Yellow card	(yellow card) (yellow-red card)	Red card	Yellow card	(yellow card) (yellow-red card)	Red card	Yellow card	(yellow card) (yellow-red card)	Red card	Yellow card	(yellow card) (yellow-red card)	Red card	Yellow card	(yellow card) (yellow-red card)	Red card
1	6	(England)	MF	Ryan Wintle	5	0	1	0	0	0	1	0	0	1	0	0	7	0	1
2	3	(England)	DF	Joel Bagan	8	0	0	0	0	0	1	0	0	0	0	0	9	0	0
2	18	(Australia)	MF	Alex Robertson	8	0	0	0	0	0	1	0	0	0	0	0	9	0	0
4	44	(Wales)	DF	Ronan Kpakio	5	0	0	0	0	0	2	0	0	1	0	0	8	0	0
5	27	(Wales)	MF	Joel Colwill	7	0	0	0	0	0	0	0	0	0	0	0	7	0	0
6	4	(Nigeria)	DF	Gabriel Osho	3	0	1	0	0	0	0	0	0	0	0	0	3	0	1
6	14	(Scotland)	MF	David Turnbull	4	0	0	0	0	0	0	0	0	2	0	0	6	0	0
6	48	(Wales)	DF	Dylan Lawlor	6	0	0	0	0	0	0	0	0	0	0	0	6	0	0
9	12	(England)	DF	Calum Chambers	4	0	0	0	0	0	1	0	0	0	0	0	5	0	0
9	38	(England)	DF	Perry Ng	4	0	0	0	0	0	1	0	0	0	0	0	5	0	0
11	2	(England)	DF	Will Fish	4	0	0	0	0	0	0	0	0	0	0	0	4	0	0
11	8	(England)	MF	Omari Kellyman	4	0	0	0	0	0	0	0	0	0	0	0	4	0	0
13	10	(Wales)	MF	Rubin Colwill	3	0	0	0	0	0	0	0	0	0	0	0	3	0	0
13	11	(England)	MF	Ollie Tanner	3	0	0	0	0	0	0	0	0	0	0	0	3	0	0
13	16	(England)	FW	Chris Willock	3	0	0	0	0	0	0	0	0	0	0	0	3	0	0
13	22	(Denmark)	CF	Yousef Salech	3	0	0	0	0	0	0	0	0	0	0	0	3	0	0
17	13	(England)	GK	Nathan Trott	2	0	0	0	0	0	0	0	0	0	0	0	2	0	0
17	39	(Wales)	FW	Isaak Davies	1	0	0	0	0	0	0	0	0	1	0	0	2	0	0
17	45	(Wales)	FW	Cian Ashford	0	0	0	0	0	0	0	0	0	0	1	0	0	1	0
17	47	(Republic of Ireland)	FW	Callum Robinson	1	0	0	0	0	0	1	0	0	0	0	0	2	0	0
19	28	(Wales)	MF	Dakarai Mafico	1	0	0	0	0	0	0	0	0	0	0	0	1	0	0
19	58	(Wales)	DF	T-Jay Parfitt	0	0	0	0	0	0	0	0	0	1	0	0	1	0	0
19	60	(Wales)	DF	Ajays Debono	0	0	0	0	0	0	0	0	0	1	0	0	1	0	0
19	61	(Wales)	MF	Cody Twose	0	0	0	0	0	0	0	0	0	1	0	0	1	0	0
19	63	(Wales)	MF	Jake Daniels	0	0	0	0	0	0	0	0	0	1	0	0	1	0	0
Total					79	0	2	0	0	0	9	0	0	8	1	0	96	1	2

=== Clean sheets ===
Rank	No.	Nat.	Name	League One	FA Cup	EFL Cup	EFL Trophy	Total
1	13	(England)	Nathan Trott	16	0	1	0	17
2	41	(Wales)	Matthew Turner	1	0	1	1	3
Total				17	0	2	1	20
