= Harry Tyrer =

Harry Tyrer is the name of:

- Harry Tyrer (footballer, born 1868)
- Harry Tyrer (footballer, born 2001)
