= Yousef Salech =

Danish footballer (born 2002)

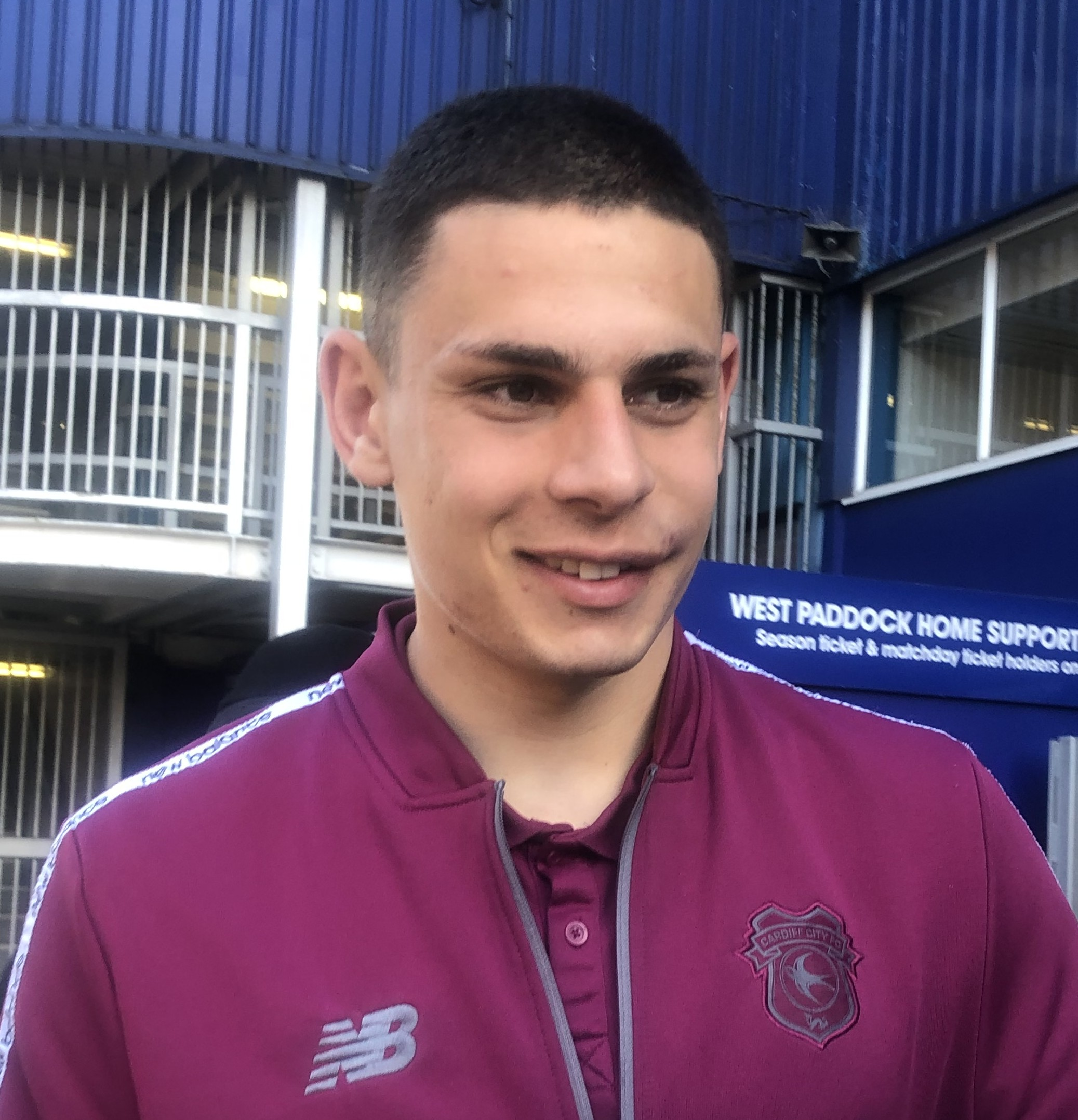
- Salech in 2025

Personal information
- Full name: Yousef Salech
- Date of birth: 17 January 2002 (age 24)
- Place of birth: Hellerup, Denmark
- Height: 1.95 m (6 ft 5 in)
- Position: Forward

Team information
- Current team: Cardiff City
- Number: 9

Youth career
- 2008–2013: Skjold
- 2013–2020: HIK

Senior career*
Years	Team	Apps	(Gls)
2020–2021	HIK	25	(7)
2021–2024	Brøndby	9	(0)
2022–2023	→ HB Køge (loan)	24	(15)
2023–2024	→ Beveren (loan)	16	(1)
2024–2025	Sirius	27	(11)
2025–	Cardiff City	66	(27)
- * Club domestic league appearances and goals as of 7 November 2026

Yousef Salech (Arabic: يوسف صالح; born 17 January 2002) is a Danish professional footballer who plays as a forward for EFL Championship club Cardiff City.

== Career ==
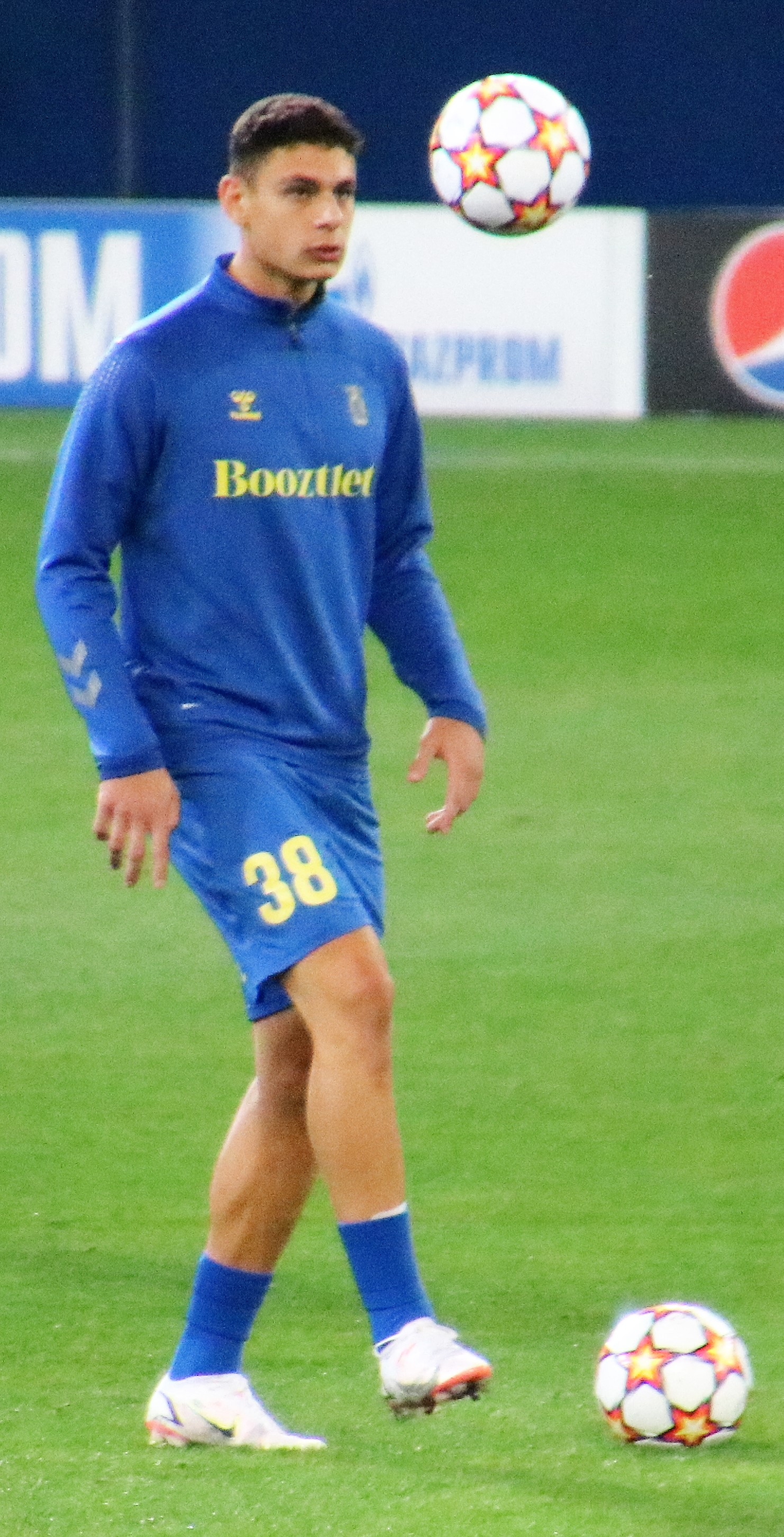
Salech in 2021.

=== Brøndby ===
Salech signed his first professional contract with Danish Superliga club Brøndby on 28 June 2021, a four-year deal. He made his debut on 1 May 2022, coming on as a substitute for Marko Divković in the 73rd minute of a 2–1 league loss to Randers.

==== HB Køge (loan) ====
On 31 August 2022, Salech was loaned out to Danish 1st Division side HB Køge for the rest of the season. He scored 15 goals in 25 appearances for Svanerne, before returning to Brøndby ahead of the 2023–24 season.

==== Beveren (loan) ====
Salech moved on a season-long loan to Belgian Challenger Pro League club Beveren on 28 August 2023, with an option for Brøndby to recall him in January 2024. He scored six minutes into his debut for Beveren on 3 September, helping Beveren to a 2–0 victory over SL16.

=== IK Sirius ===
On 22 February 2024 it was confirmed that Salech had been sold to Swedish Allsvenskan club IK Sirius with immediate effect for a transfer fee of €600.000 plus a 25% sell-on clause. Salech signed a deal until the end of 2028.

=== Cardiff City ===
On 17 January 2025, Salech joined Championship club Cardiff City, on a four-and-a-half-year deal for an undisclosed fee.

== Personal life ==
Born in Denmark, Salech is of Polish-Palestinian descent. His mother is from Poland while his father was born in Palestine and later moved to Jordan.

== Career statistics ==
As of match played 19 September 2026

Appearances and goals by club, season and competition
Club	Season	League			National cup (Note: Includes Danish Cup, Belgian Cup, FA Cup)		League cup (Note: Includes EFL Cup)		Europe		Other		Total	
Club	Season	Division	Apps	Goals	Apps	Goals	Apps	Goals	Apps	Goals	Apps	Goals	Apps	Goals
Hellerup IK	2020–21	2nd Division	25	7	1	0	—		—		—		26	7
Brøndby	2021–22	Superliga	2	0	0	0	—		0	0	—		2	0
Brøndby	2022–23	Superliga	4	0	0	0	—		2 (Note: Appearances in UEFA Europa Conference League)	0	—		6	0
Brøndby	2023–24	Superliga	3	0	—		—		—		—		3	0
Brøndby	Total		9	0	0	0	—		2	0	—		11	0
HB Køge (loan)	2022–23	1st Division	24	15	1	0	—		—		—		25	15
Beveren (loan)	2023–24	Challenger Pro League	12	1	3	0	—		—		—		15	1
IK Sirius	2024	Allsvenskan	27	11	1	1	—		—		—		28	12
IK Sirius	Total		63	27	5	1	—		—		—		68	28
Cardiff City	2024–25	Championship	20	8	2	1	—		—		—		22	9
Cardiff City	2025–26	League One	34	14	1	0	4	1	—		1 (Note: Appearance in EFL Trophy)	0	40	15
Cardiff City	2026–27	Championship	8	2	0	0	2	3	—		0	0	10	5
Cardiff City	Total		62	24	3	1	6	4	0	0	1	0	72	29
Career total			134	51	9	2	6	4	2	0	1	0	151	57
