= Will Fish =

English footballer

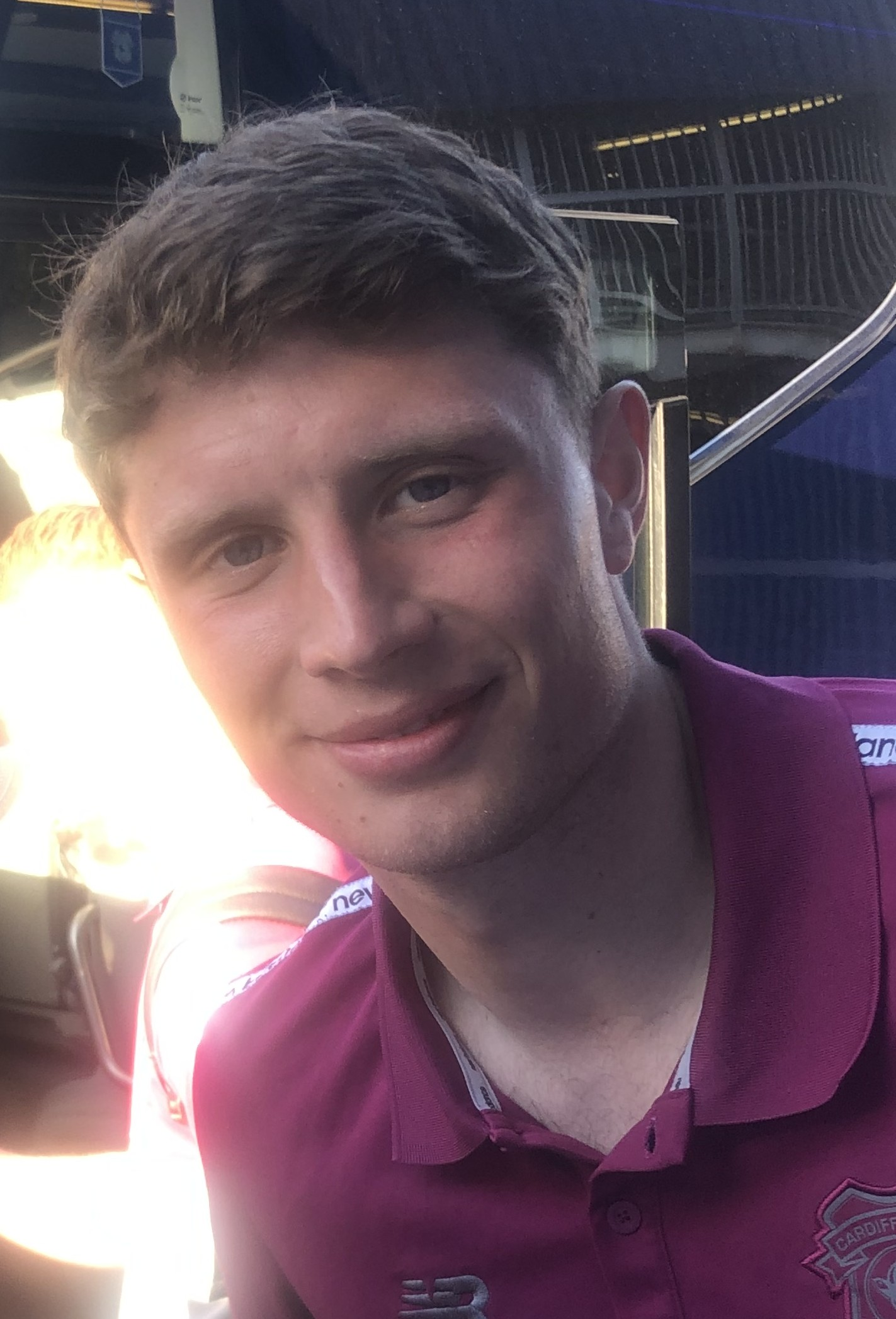
- Will Fish in 2025

Personal information
- Full name: William Thomas Fish
- Date of birth: 17 February 2003 (age 23)
- Place of birth: Manchester, England
- Height: 6 ft 1 in (1.85 m)
- Position: Centre-back

Team information
- Current team: Cardiff City
- Number: 2

Youth career
- –2021: Manchester United

Senior career*
Years	Team	Apps	(Gls)
2021–2024	Manchester United	1	(0)
2021–2022	→ Stockport County (loan)	2	(0)
2022–2023	→ Hibernian (loan)	21	(3)
2023–2024	→ Hibernian (loan)	34	(1)
2024–	Cardiff City	65	(1)

International career
2019	England U17	3	(1)
2021	England U18	1	(0)
2021	England U19	2	(0)
- * Club domestic league appearances and goals as of 8 November 2026 (UTC)

William Thomas Fish (born 17 February 2003) is an English professional footballer who plays as a centre-back for EFL Championship club Cardiff City.

A graduate of Manchester United's youth system, Fish made his first-team debut for the club in a Premier League game in May 2021. He had a loan spell at Stockport County during the 2021–22 season, and was loaned twice to Hibernian.

Fish has represented England at under-17, under-18 and under-19 levels.

== Club career ==
Fish made his professional debut for Manchester United on 23 May 2021 in their final game of the 2020–21 Premier League season against Wolverhampton Wanderers, coming on as a substitute for Daniel James in a 2–1 win.

On 23 July 2021, Stockport County signed Fish on a season-long loan. On 7 January 2022, Manchester United announced that he had been recalled from Stockport.

On 1 September 2022, Fish joined Hibernian on a season-long loan. He made his debut for Hibernian in a 1–0 defeat to Dundee United on 11 October 2022. Fish played regularly for Hibs during the second half of the 2022–23 season. After playing for Manchester United in pre-season matches during July 2023, Fish rejoined Hibernian on loan for the 2023–24 season.

On 23 August 2024, Fish left Manchester United and joined EFL Championship club Cardiff City on a four-year deal. He scored his first goal for The Bluebirds on 28 October 2025, the winner in a 2–1 victory at Wrexham in the fourth round of the Carabao Cup.

== International career ==
Fish has played youth international football for England at under-17, under-18 and under-19 levels.

In October 2019, Fish scored for the England under-17 team in a defeat against Germany.

On 2 September 2021, Fish made his debut for the England under-19 team during a 2–0 victory over Italy at St. George's Park.

== Career statistics ==
As of match played 1 November 2025

Appearances and goals by club, season and competition
Club	Season	League			National cup (Note: Includes FA Cup, Scottish Cup)		League cup (Note: Includes EFL Cup, Scottish League Cup)		Europe		Other		Total	
Club	Season	Division	Apps	Goals	Apps	Goals	Apps	Goals	Apps	Goals	Apps	Goals	Apps	Goals
Manchester United U21	2020–21	—	—		—		—		—		4 (Note: Appearances in EFL Trophy)	0	4	0
Manchester United	2020–21	Premier League	1	0	0	0	0	0	0	0	—		1	0
Manchester United	2021–22	Premier League	0	0	0	0	0	0	0	0	—		0	0
Manchester United	2022–23	Premier League	0	0	0	0	0	0	0	0	—		0	0
Manchester United	2023–24	Premier League	0	0	0	0	0	0	0	0	—		0	0
Manchester United	Total		1	0	0	0	0	0	0	0	0	0	1	0
Stockport County (loan)	2021–22	National League	2	0	0	0	—		—		0	0	2	0
Hibernian (loan)	2022–23	Scottish Premiership	21	3	0	0	0	0	—		—		21	3
Hibernian (loan)	2023–24	Scottish Premiership	34	1	3	0	3	0	5 (Note: Appearances in UEFA Europa Conference League)	0	—		45	1
Cardiff City	2024–25	Championship	21	0	3	0	0	0	0	0	0	0	24	0
Cardiff City	2025–26	EFL League One	12	0	1	0	3	1	—		2	0	18	1
Cardiff City	Total		33	0	4	0	3	1	0	0	2	0	42	1
Career total			91	4	7	0	6	1	5	0	6	0	115	5
