= Calum Scanlon =

English footballer (born 2005)

Personal information
- Full name: Calum Alexander Scanlon
- Date of birth: 14 February 2005 (age 21)
- Place of birth: Birmingham, England
- Height: 5 ft 7 in (1.71 m)
- Position: Left-back

Team information
- Current team: Cardiff City (on loan from Liverpool)
- Number: 23

Youth career
- –2020: Birmingham City
- 2020–2023: Liverpool

Senior career*
Years	Team	Apps	(Gls)
2023–	Liverpool	0	(0)
2024–2025	→ Millwall (loan)	4	(1)
2026	→ Cardiff City (loan)	8	(0)
2026–	→ Cardiff City (loan)	14	(0)

International career^{‡}
2022	England U17	4	(0)
2023	England U18	1	(0)
2023	England U19	8	(0)
2024–	England U20	1	(0)
- * Club domestic league appearances and goals as of 8 November 2026 (UTC) ‡ National team caps and goals as of 15:34, 10 September 2024 (UTC)

Calum Alexander Scanlon (born 14 February 2005) is an English professional footballer who plays as a left-back for EFL Championship club Cardiff City, on loan from Premier League club Liverpool. He has represented England at international youth level.

== Club career ==
Scanlon joined Liverpool from Birmingham City as a 15-year-old, in a reported £500,000 deal in December 2020. He signed his first professional contract with the club in March 2022 shortly after his 18th birthday. In July 2023, Scanlon was included in the Liverpool first-team pre-season training camp to Germany. He was then included in Liverpool's 27-man squad to tour Singapore on 27 July 2023.

In September 2023, Scanlon scored for Liverpool U21 against EFL League Two side Morecambe in the EFL Trophy. Scanlon continued to train with the Liverpool first-team squad during the 2023–24 season following an injury to first-choice left-back Andy Robertson, and was named among the match day substitutes for the Premier League match against local rivals Everton on 21 October 2023. He made his senior debut for Liverpool in a 5–1 UEFA Europa League victory over Toulouse at Anfield on 26 October 2023. Scanlon signed a new long-term professional contract with Liverpool in April 2024.

On 29 August 2024, Scanlon joined Championship side Millwall on loan until the end of the season. On 21 January 2025, Scanlon scored his first professional goal in a 2–2 draw against Cardiff City.

On 1 February 2026, Scanlon joined League One leaders Cardiff City on loan for the remainder of the 2025–26 season.

== International career ==
Scanlon has represented England at under-17, under-18 and under-19 level. In September 2024 he started for England U20 in a victory against Romania at Edgeley Park.

== Career statistics ==
=== Club ===
As of end of 2025–26 season

Appearances and goals by club, season and competition
Club	Season	League			FA Cup		EFL Cup		Europe		Other		Total	
Club	Season	Division	Apps	Goals	Apps	Goals	Apps	Goals	Apps	Goals	Apps	Goals	Apps	Goals
Liverpool U21	2023–24	—			—		—		—		2 (Note: Appearance(s) in EFL Trophy)	1	2	1
Liverpool	2023–24	Premier League	0	0	0	0	0	0	2 (Note: Appearance(s) in UEFA Europa League)	0	—		2	0
Liverpool	2024–25	Premier League	0	0	0	0	0	0	0	0	—		0	0
Liverpool	2025–26	Premier League	0	0	0	0	0	0	0	0	—		0	0
Liverpool	Liverpool total		0	0	0	0	0	0	2	0	0	0	2	0
Millwall (loan)	2024–25	Championship	4	1	0	0	0	0	—		—		4	1
Cardiff City (loan)	2025–26	League One	8	0	0	0	0	0	—		—		8	0
Career total			12	1	0	0	0	0	2	0	2	1	16	2
