= Dylan Lawlor =

Welsh footballer (born 2006)

Personal information
- Full name: Dylan Rhys Lawlor
- Date of birth: 1 January 2006 (age 20)
- Place of birth: Caerphilly, Wales
- Height: 1.88 m (6 ft 2 in)
- Position: Defender

Team information
- Current team: Cardiff City
- Number: 48

Youth career
- 2013-2025: Cardiff City

Senior career*
Years	Team	Apps	(Gls)
2024–	Cardiff City	36	(2)

International career^{‡}
2022–2023	Wales U17	9	(1)
2023–2025	Wales U19	3	(0)
2025–	Wales U21	1	(0)
2025–	Wales	6	(0)
- * Club domestic league appearances and goals as of 1 November 2026 (UTC) ‡ National team caps and goals as of 20:55, 2 June 2026 (UTC)

Dylan Rhys Lawlor (born 1 January 2006) is a Welsh professional footballer who plays as a defender for EFL Championship club Cardiff City and the Wales national team.

== Club career ==
A central defender, he was born in Caerphilly, Wales and attended Ysgol Gyfun Cwm Rhymni (a Welsh-medium secondary school). He joined Cardiff City at the age of seven. He was one of a number of young Welsh players at Cardiff City name-checked by Cardiff U21 boss Darren Purse in May 2024 as having high potential. That season, he had captained the Cardiff City U21 team.

He made his senior debut for Cardiff City under manager Omer Riza, starting their 2-0 FA Cup defeat on 28 February 2025 against Aston Villa, as a 19 year-old.

Having established himself as a starting centre-back under new manager Brian Barry-Murphy in the early weeks of the 2025–26 season, he was named EFL Young Player of the Month for August 2025. He continued to impress over the first few months of the season, reportedly drawing interest from Bundesliga club Bayern Munich ahead of the January transfer window.

== International career ==
Born in Wales, Lawlor is of partial Irish descent and could have qualified to play for Ireland. He has captained Wales at under-16 and under-19 level. In March 2023, he scored a late header to ensure Wales Under-17s qualified for the European U17 Championships for the first time, in a 2–2 draw with Montenegro U17. On 6 June 2025 Lawlor made his Wales under-21 debut in a friendly match against Norway.

Lawlor was called up to the Wales senior squad for the first time for the World Cup qualifying match against Belgium on 9 June 2025. On 4 September 2025 he made his international debut for Wales in the starting line-up for the World Cup qualifying match 1-0 win against Kazakhstan. Lawlor was awarded the Man-of-the-Match award for his performance.

== Career statistics ==
As of match played 19 September 2026

Appearances and goals by club, season and competition
Club	Season	League			FA Cup		League Cup		Other		Total	
Club	Season	Division	Apps	Goals	Apps	Goals	Apps	Goals	Apps	Goals	Apps	Goals
Cardiff City	2024–25	Championship	1	0	1	0	0	0	—		2	0
Cardiff City	2025–26	League One	32	2	1	0	2	0	2 (Note: Appearances in EFL Trophy)	0	37	3
Cardiff City	2026–27	Championship	1	0	0	0	0	0	—		1	0
Career total			34	2	2	0	2	0	2	0	40	3

=== International ===
As of match played 2 June 2026

Appearances and goals by national team and year
National team	Year	Apps	Goals
Wales	2025	3	0
Wales	2026	3	0
Total		6	0

== Honours ==
Individual

- EFL Young Player of the Month: August 2025
