= Henry Tyler =

Henry Tyler may refer to:

- Henry S. Tyler (1851–1896), American mayor
- Henry Tyler (British politician) (1827–1908), British inspector of railways and politician
- Henry Tyler (cricketer) (born 1992), Filipino cricketer

== See also ==
- Harry Tyler (disambiguation)
