= Harrison Tyler =

Harrison Tyler may refer to:

- Harrison Parker Tyler (1904–1974), American author, poet, and film critic
- Harrison Ruffin Tyler (1928–2025), American chemical engineer, businessperson, and preservationist

== See also ==
- Harry Tyler (disambiguation)
- Harold Tyler (disambiguation)
- Harrison and Tyler, comedians
