= Tanatswa Nyakuhwa =

Welsh footballer

Personal information
- Full name: Tanatswa Thierry Nyakuhwa
- Date of birth: 17 September 2005 (age 21)
- Place of birth: Newport, Wales
- Position: Forward

Team information
- Current team: Newport County (on loan from Cardiff City)
- Number: 21

Youth career
- 2015–2024: Cardiff City

Senior career*
Years	Team	Apps	(Gls)
2025–	Cardiff City	4	(0)
2026	→ Newport County (loan)	7	(0)
2026–	→ Newport County (loan)	5	(1)

International career^{‡}
2021–2022	Wales U17	2	(0)
2023	Wales U18	1	(0)
2023–	Wales U19	7	(1)
2025–	Wales U21	8	(1)
- * Club domestic league appearances and goals as of 17:15, 17 October 2026 (UTC) ‡ National team caps and goals as of 8 October 2026

Tanatswa Thierry Nyakuhwa (born 17 September 2005) is a Welsh professional footballer who plays as a forward for EFL League Two club Newport County on loan from EFL Championship club Cardiff City. He is a Wales under-21 international.

== Career ==
Nyakuhwa grew up in Newport, Wales, and is a product of the Cardiff City academy, having joined the club at the age of seven. He progressed through the club’s under-18 and under-21 sides before signing his first professional contract with Cardiff City in July 2024. He made his senior Cardiff debut on 3 May 2025 in the 4-2 EFL Championship defeat against Norwich City as a second-half substitute. During the 2025–26 season, he made nine senior appearances for the club, including two starts in the EFL Trophy.

On 14 January 2026, Nyakuhwa joined League Two side Newport County, his hometown club, on loan until the end of the 2025-26 season. He grew up attending Newport County matches at Rodney Parade, including FA Cup ties against higher-ranked opposition. He made his debut for Newport on 17 January 2026 in the EFL League Two 3-2 defeat to Gillingham. On 1 September 2026 Nyakuhwa rejoined Newport County on loan for the remainder of the 2026-27 season. He scored his first Newport goal on 22 September 2026 in the EFL Trophy 2-0 win against Swindon Town.

== International career ==
Born in Wales, Nyakuhwa is of Zimbabwean descent. He was called up to the Wales under-21 squad for the first time in October 2025. He is also eligible to represent Zimbabwe and his father has expressed openness to a switch once the country’s FIFA suspension is lifted.

== Career statistics ==
As of 17 October 2026

Appearances and goals by club, season and competition
Club	Season	League			FA Cup		League Cup		Other		Total	
Club	Season	Division	Apps	Goals	Apps	Goals	Apps	Goals	Apps	Goals	Apps	Goals
Cardiff City	2024–25	Championship	1	0	0	0	0	0	—		1	0
Cardiff City	2025–26	League One	3	0	1	0	2	0	2 (Note: Appearance(s) in EFL Trophy)	0	8	0
Cardiff City	2026–27	Championship	0	0	—		—		—		0	0
Cardiff City	Total		4	0	1	0	2	0	2	0	9	0
Newport County (loan)	2025–26	League Two	7	0	0	0	0	0	0	0	7	0
Newport County (loan)	2026–27	League Two	5	1	0	0	0	0	1	1	6	2
Career total			16	1	1	0	2	0	3	1	22	2
