= Cian Ashford =

Welsh footballer

Personal information
- Full name: Cian Ty Ashford
- Date of birth: 24 September 2004 (age 22)
- Place of birth: Rhondda, Wales
- Height: 1.79 m (5 ft 10 in)
- Position: Forward

Team information
- Current team: Cardiff City
- Number: 45

Youth career
- 2010–2022: Cardiff City

Senior career*
Years	Team	Apps	(Gls)
2022–	Cardiff City	84	(9)

International career^{‡}
2019	Wales U15	2	(1)
2019–2020	Wales U16	3	(1)
2021–2022	Wales U18	4	(0)
2023–	Wales U21	12	(3)
- * Club domestic league appearances and goals as of 8 November 2026 (UTC) ‡ National team caps and goals as of 15:19, 31 March 2026 (UTC)

Cian Ty Ashford is a Welsh footballer who plays as a forward for EFL Championship club Cardiff City. He is a Wales Under-21 international.

== Career ==
Ashford joined the Cardiff City academy at the age of six, signing a first professional contract with the club in June 2023. He had first caught the eye of the first-team in November 2020, when he was called up to first-team training by then manager Neil Harris, impressing with three goals in a 4v4 match with the senior squad.

In August 2023, Ashford made his senior debut for Cardiff City in the EFL Cup against Colchester United. In January 2024, he signed a new contract to keep him at the club until June 2027. On 10 April 2024, he made his league debut for Cardiff in a 1–0 victory over Birmingham City. Following the match, he was described as "the future for Cardiff" by teammate Jamilu Collins. In his third league appearance for the club, he scored his first senior goal, a 96th minute winner from twenty-five yards against promotion hopefuls Southampton.

== International career ==
Ashford made his Wales under-21 debut on 24 October 2023 in the UEFA European Under–21 qualifier against Czech Republic as a 91st-minute substitute, immediately scoring the equalising goal in the 1–1 draw. In September 2026 he was called up to the Wales senior squad for the first time.

== Career statistics ==
As of match played 19 September 2026

Appearances and goals by club, season and competition
Club	Season	League			FA Cup		League Cup		Other		Total	
Club	Season	Division	Apps	Goals	Apps	Goals	Apps	Goals	Apps	Goals	Apps	Goals
Cardiff City	2023–24	EFL Championship	5	1	1	0	3	0	—		9	1
Cardiff City	2024–25	EFL Championship	28	2	2	1	1	0	—		31	3
Cardiff City	2025–26	EFL League One	36	4	1	0	5	1	2 (Note: Appearances in EFL Trophy)	0	44	5
Cardiff City	2026–27	EFL Championship	8	2	0	0	2	0	—		10	2
Career total			77	9	4	1	11	1	2	0	94	11
