= Harry Tyrer (footballer, born 2001) =

English footballer (born 2001)

Personal information
- Full name: Harry Alfred Tyrer
- Date of birth: 6 December 2001 (age 24)
- Place of birth: Crosby, England
- Height: 1.94 m (6 ft 4 in)
- Position: Goalkeeper

Team information
- Current team: Cardiff City
- Number: 30

Youth career
- 2008–2022: Everton

Senior career*
Years	Team	Apps	(Gls)
2022–2026	Everton	0	(0)
2022–2023	→ Chester (loan)	46	(0)
2023–2024	→ Chesterfield (loan)	42	(0)
2024–2025	→ Blackpool (loan)	38	(0)
2026–	Cardiff City	2	(0)
- * Club domestic league appearances and goals as of 2 May 2026 (UTC)

Harry Alfred Tyrer (born 6 December 2001) is an English professional footballer who plays as a goalkeeper for EFL Championship club Cardiff City.

== Career ==
=== Everton ===
Born in Crosby, Tyrer came through the Everton academy, joining as a 7-year-old. He signed his first professional contract with Everton on 25 January 2020.

Prior to signing his deal, Tyrer featured for Everton U21 in four EFL Trophy games during the 2019–20 campaign. He played for Everton in a pre-season game in September 2020, against Preston North End, which ended up a 2–0 win at Goodison Park. Tyrer went onto feature once in the EFL Trophy during the 2021–22 campaign and on 11 January 2022, Tyrer signed a new three-and-a-half-year contract, which runs until June 2025.

On 8 July 2022, Tyrer joined National League North side Chester on a season-long loan; he went on to make 55 appearances across all competitions for The Seals before returning to Everton at the conclusion of the deal.

On 27 June 2023, Tyrer was loaned out again, this time to National League side Chesterfield, again for the duration of the season. In April 2024, while still on loan, Tyrer extended his contract with Everton until the summer of 2026. He went onto make 43 appearances for The Spireites across all competitions as Chesterfield were promoted back to the EFL after six seasons away.

On 27 August 2024, Tyrer joined League One side Blackpool on a season-long loan. On 3 September, he made his debut for The Tangerines during an EFL Trophy group game against Crewe Alexandra, which resulted in a 4–1 win for Blackpool.

=== Cardiff City ===
On 16 January 2026, Tyrer joined League One club Cardiff City on a three-and-a-half year deal for an undisclosed fee, following the lifting of a transfer embargo on the club.

== Career statistics ==
As of 2 May 2026

Appearances and goals by club, season and competition
Club	Season	League			FA Cup		EFL Cup		Other		Total	
Club	Season	Division	Apps	Goals	Apps	Goals	Apps	Goals	Apps	Goals	Apps	Goals
Everton U21	2019–20	—	—		—		—		4 (Note: Appearance(s) in EFL Trophy)	0	4	0
Everton U21	2020–21	—	—		—		—		0	0	0	0
Everton U21	2021–22	—	—		—		—		1	0	1	0
Everton U21	2025–26	—	—		—		—		1	0	1	0
Everton U21	Total		—		—		—		6	0	6	0
Chester (loan)	2022–23	National League North	46	0	5	0	0	0	4 (Note: Two appearances in FA Trophy, one appearance in Cheshire Senior Cup and one appearance in National League North play-offs)	0	55	0
Chesterfield (loan)	2023–24	National League	42	0	1	0	0	0	0	0	43	0
Blackpool (loan)	2024–25	League One	38	0	1	0	0	0	3	0	42	0
Cardiff City	2025–26	League One	2	0	0	0	0	0	0	0	2	0
Career total			128	0	7	0	0	0	13	0	148	0
