= Matthew Turner (footballer, born 2002) =

Welsh footballer (born 2002)

Personal information
- Full name: Matthew David Turner
- Date of birth: 27 March 2002 (age 24)
- Place of birth: Pembrey, Wales
- Height: 1.91 m (6 ft 3 in)
- Position: Goalkeeper

Team information
- Current team: Cardiff City
- Number: 41

Youth career
- –2018: Pontardawe Town
- 2018–2021: Leeds United
- 2021–2025: Cardiff City

Senior career*
Years	Team	Apps	(Gls)
2020–2021	Leeds United	0	(0)
2020–2021	→ Haverfordwest County (loan)	9	(0)
2023–	Cardiff City	3	(0)
2023	→ Aberystwyth Town (loan)	13	(1)
- * Club domestic league appearances and goals as of 23:43, 31 May 2026 (UTC)

Matthew David Turner (born 27 March 2002) is a Welsh professional footballer who plays as a goalkeeper for EFL Championship club Cardiff City.

== Early career ==
Turner attended Glan-y-Mor Comprehensive School in Burry Port. He started his career with Pontardawe Town, before joining Leeds United in 2018.

== Career ==
Turner departed the Leeds United academy at the end of the 2020–21 season, having spent time on loan with Haverfordwest County. In September 2021, he joined Cardiff City on a two-year deal.

In January 2023, Turner joined Cymru Premier club Aberystwyth Town on loan. On 1 April 2023, he scored a dramatic last-minute equaliser against Pontypridd United.

In June 2024, he signed a new two-year contract with the club having been involved with first-team training over the 2023–24 season.

On 2 August 2025, the opening day of the 2025–26 season, Turner made his senior debut for Cardiff in the starting line-up for the 2–1 EFL League One win against Peterborough United. Following a number of impressive saves, head coach Brian Barry-Murphy described his performance as "exceptional".
