= Wales national under-21 football team =

Association football team

Wales Under-21
- Nickname: Young Dragons (Welsh: Dreigiau Ifanc)
- Association: Football Association of Wales (FAW)
- Confederation: UEFA (Europe)
- Head coach: Matt Jones
- Most caps: Shaun MacDonald (25)
- Top scorer: Ched Evans (13)
- FIFA code: WAL
First colours	Second colours

First international
- England 0–0 Wales (Wolverhampton, England; 15 December 1976)

Biggest win
- Gibraltar 0–7 Wales (Gibraltar; 12 November 2021)

Biggest defeat
- Italy 8–1 Wales (Pavia, Italy; 5 September 2003); Wales 0–7 Belgium (Newport, Wales; 10 October 2025)

The Wales national under-21 football team, also known as the Wales U21s, is the national under-21 football team of Wales and is controlled by the Football Association of Wales. The team competes in the UEFA European Under-21 Championship, held every two years. To date Wales haven't yet qualified for the finals tournament but in recent years have shown good form, losing in a playoff (5–4) to England in the 2009 qualifying campaign and finishing second in their group two years later, after leading their group until their last game Wales only needed a draw to qualify for the play-offs but lost 1–0 away to Italy.

The under-21 team came into existence following the realignment of UEFA's youth competitions in 1976. A goalless draw in a friendly against England at Wolverhampton Wanderers' Molineux Stadium was Wales U21s' first result.

The national under-21 team is the highest level of youth football in Wales, and is open to any players who were born in Wales or whose parents or grandparents were born in Wales. This team is for Welsh players aged 21 or under at the start of a two-year UEFA European Under-21 Championship campaign, so players can be, and often are, up to 23 years old. Also in existence are teams for Under-20s (for non-UEFA tournaments), Under-19s and Under 17s. As long as they are eligible, players can play at any level, making it possible to play for the U21s, senior side and again for the U21s.

== First match ==
In the first match against England, the team was: Glan Letheran (Leeds United), Phil Bater (Bristol Rovers), Les Tibbott (Ipswich Town), Byron Stevenson (Leeds United), John Roberts (Wrexham), Peter Sayer (Cardiff City), Gwyn Thomas (Leeds), Robbie James, Alan Curtis (both Swansea City), Wayne Hughes (West Brom), Andrew Evans (Bristol Rovers). The subs were: Wayne Cegielski (Wrexham), Doug Evans (Norwich City), Tony Norman (Burnley). Cegielski replaced Thomas on 75 minutes.

John Roberts was already a full international and was one of the two over-age players permitted. He was captain for the evening.

== Recent history ==
Historically the team was viewed by the Welsh national management as a hole to be filled rather than a team to be used to nurture young international players. Many of the great Welsh players spent little time at the under-21 team level. Ryan Giggs only made one appearance for the under-21 team before making his senior debut against Germany the next day.

From 2004 onward however, the former Wales national football team manager John Toshack and former Wales Under 21 manager Brian Flynn used the under-21 team to create a pool of youthful Welsh talent. The team now has a much better tracking system of young Welsh players, and has seen a marked improvement in players and team results. Recent results have seen them achieve big wins against Estonia (5–1), Northern Ireland (4–0) and France (4–2).

Players who have made the step from the U21s to attain over 50 caps for the senior squad are Gary Speed, Simon Davies, Carl Robinson, Craig Bellamy, Robert Earnshaw, James Collins, John Hartson, Andy King, Joe Ledley, Sam Vokes, Wayne Hennessey, Chris Gunter, Gareth Bale, Aaron Ramsey, Joe Allen, Connor Roberts, Harry Wilson, Daniel James, Joe Rodon and Chris Mepham.

On 15 May 2008, they played a friendly against England U21s to mark the 100th match in the history of the side, losing 2–0.

A 3–0 victory against Romania in September 2008 meant that the Under-21 side finished top of their qualifying group for the first time in their history. It meant Wales would go into a two-legged play-off against England in October 2008 for a place in the finals of the 2009 UEFA Under-21 Championship to be played in Sweden. Wales lost the playoff 5–4 over the course of two legs. Losing 3–2 at home in the first leg and drawing 2–2 away in the second.

Wales started their qualifying campaign for the 2013 UEFA European Under-21 Football Championship with a 1–0 away win against Andorra, a 3–1 away loss against Montenegro, a 1–0 home win against Montenegro, a 1–0 home defeat against Czech Republic and a 0–0 away draw against Armenia.

In May 2012 Brian Flynn vacated his position as Wales under-21 manager at the end of his contract and in July 2012 Geraint Williams was appointed team manager Williams resigned as team manager on 5 December 2016. On 15 March 2017 it was announced that former Port Vale and Northampton Town manager Rob Page had left his position on the coaching staff at Nottingham Forest to become Wales under-21 manager. In August 2019 Page was appointed assistant coach to the senior Wales squad under Ryan Giggs with Paul Bodin stepping up from the Under 19's to manage the Under 21 team.

In November 2021, Wales picked up their biggest ever win at under-21 level when they beat Gibraltar 7–0 in a qualifier for the 2023 UEFA European Under-21 Championship. In July 2022 Bodin's contract with Wales Under-21 was terminated by mutual consent. In September 2022, Matt Jones was appointed as manager.

== Players ==
=== Latest squad ===
Players born on or after 1 January 2004 are eligible for the 2027 UEFA European Under-21 Championship.

The following players were called up for the 2027 UEFA European Under-21 Championship qualification Group I matches against Belgium and Austria on 29 September and 6 October 2026.

Caps and goals as of 6 October 2026, after the match against Austria. Players in bold have attained full international caps.

No.	Pos.	Player	Date of birth (age)	Caps	Goals	Club
21	GK	Evan Watts	23 September 2004 (age 22)	8	0	(Football Association of Wales) Swansea City
1	GK	Joe Duncan	22 July 2006 (age 20)	2	0	(The Football Association) Southend United (on loan from Bristol City)
12	GK	Luke Armstrong	19 June 2006 (age 20)	0	0	(Scottish Football Association) Raith Rovers (on loan from Cardiff City)
5	DF	Archie Harris	27 December 2004 (age 21)	9	1	(The Football Association) Wigan Athletic
2	DF	Alex Williams	2 January 2005 (age 21)	9	0	(Scottish Football Association) Hibernian (on loan from West Bromwich Albion)
4	DF	George Nevett	14 February 2006 (age 20)	4	0	(The Football Association) Tranmere Rovers (on loan from Peterborough United)
20	DF	Dan Cox	30 January 2006 (age 20)	5	0	(The Football Association) Southend United
15	DF	Ed James	23 December 2004 (age 21)	6	0	(The Football Association) Exeter City
3	DF	**Ronan Kpakio**	25 May 2007 (age 19)	2	0	(Football Association of Wales) Cardiff City
13	DF	Noah Anyadike	19 May 2011 (age 15)	1	0	(Football Association of Wales) Cardiff City
22	DF	Reece Munro	16 December 2006 (age 19)	1	0	(The Football Association) Manchester United
10	MF	Joel Cotterill	10 October 2004 (age 22)	19	3	(Scottish Football Association) St Johnstone
8	MF	**Charlie Crew**	15 June 2006 (age 20)	11	0	(The Football Association) Walsall (on loan from Leeds United)
18	MF	Calum Agius	5 September 2005 (age 21)	8	1	(The Football Association) Crewe Alexandra
6	MF	**Kai Andrews**	6 August 2006 (age 20)	7	0	(The Football Association) Oxford United (on loan from Coventry City)
17	MF	Jonathan Bland	24 October 2005 (age 21)	7	0	(The Football Association) Barnsley
14	MF	Dakarai Mafico	7 December 2006 (age 19)	1	0	(Football Association of Wales) Cardiff City
16	MF	Charlie Stevens	31 May 2007 (age 19)	0	0	(The Football Association) Bournemouth
19	MF	Rob Tankiewicz	12 June 2009 (age 17)	0	0	(Football Association of Wales) Cardiff City
7	FW	Tanatswa Nyakuhwa	17 September 2005 (age 21)	8	1	(Football Association of Wales) Newport County (on loan from Cardiff City)
9	FW	Gabriele Biancheri	18 September 2006 (age 20)	7	2	(Austrian Football Association) Wacker Innsbruck
11	FW	Ollie Bostock	20 February 2007 (age 19)	4	0	(The Football Association) Boston United (on loan from West Bromwich Albion)
23	FW	Leon Scarlett	16 August 2009 (age 17)	2	0	(The Football Association) Queens Park Rangers

=== Recent call-ups ===
The following players have also been called up to the Wales under-21 squad and remain eligible. Players in bold have caps for the senior team.

Pos.	Player	Date of birth (age)	Caps	Goals	Club	Latest call-up
GK	Logan Stretch	4 November 2006 (age 20)	0	0	(England) Buxton (on loan from Sheffield Wednesday)	v. Belgium, 29 September 2026
GK	Kit Margetson	10 July 2006 (age 20)	1	0	(England) Manchester United	v. Denmark, 31 March 2026
GK	Lewys Benjamin	28 November 2006 (age 19)	5	0	(England) Telford United (on loan from Wolverhampton Wanderers)	v. Belarus, 14 November 2025
GK	Ronnie Hollingshead	9 September 2004 (age 22)	2	0	(England) Aston Villa	v. Sweden, 25 March 2025
DF	Ben Hammond	2 October 2004 (age 22)	6	0	(England) Boston United	v. Denmark, 31 March 2026
DF	Luey Giles	4 August 2006 (age 20)	3	0	(England) Kidderminster Harriers (on loan from Cardiff City)	v. Denmark, 31 March 2026
DF	Aled Thomas	27 September 2006 (age 20)	2	0	(England) Everton	v. Denmark, 31 March 2026
DF	Thierry Katsukunya	30 November 2005 (age 20)	4	0	(Wales) Cardiff City	v. Belarus, 14 November 2025
DF	Sam Parker	7 July 2006 (age 20)	3	0	(England) Wycombe Wanderers (on loan from Swansea City)	v. Austria, 14 October 2025
DF	Zac Williams	27 March 2004 (age 22)	2	0	(England) Barnet	v. Denmark, 8 September 2025
DF	**Dylan Lawlor**	1 January 2006 (age 20)	1	0	(Wales) Cardiff City	v. Norway, 6 June 2025
DF	Callum Tripp	28 August 2006 (age 20)	1	0	(England) Milton Keynes Dons	v. Sweden, 25 March 2025
DF	Seb Dabrowski	11 September 2005 (age 21)	1	0	(Wales) Swansea City	v. Sweden, 25 March 2025
MF	**Cameron Congreve**	24 January 2004 (age 22)	13	0	(Belgium) Westerlo	v. Denmark, 31 March 2026
MF	Elliot Myles	20 January 2007 (age 19)	1	0	(England) Norwich City	v. Denmark, 31 March 2026
MF	Rhys Thomas	5 November 2006 (age 20)	1	0	(England) Manchester City	v. Denmark, 31 March 2026
MF	Harry Ashfield	23 March 2006 (age 20)	0	0	(England) Peterborough United	v. Denmark, 31 March 2026
MF	Luke Harris	4 March 2005 (age 21)	11	1	(England) Wycombe Wanderers (on loan from Fulham)	v. Austria, 14 October 2025
MF	Ben Lloyd	14 March 2005 (age 21)	4	0	(Wales) Swansea City	v. Austria, 14 October 2025
MF	Troy Perrett	28 October 2006 (age 20)	1	0	(Wales) Cardiff City	v. Austria, 14 October 2025
MF	Vimal Yoganathan	13 January 2006 (age 20)	1	0	(England) Barnsley	v. Denmark, 8 September 2025
MF	**Joel Colwill**	27 October 2004 (age 22)	7	0	(Wales) Cardiff City	v. Denmark, 8 September 2025^{SEN}
MF	Owen Hampson	17 November 2004 (age 21)	2	0	(England) Hartlepool United	v. Sweden, 25 March 2025
MF	Logan Briggs	7 February 2006 (age 20)	1	0	(England) Northampton Town (on loan from Leicester City)	v. Sweden, 25 March 2025
MF	Daniel Watts	16 December 2005 (age 20)	1	0	(England) Exeter City (on loan from Swansea City)	v. Sweden, 25 March 2025
FW	Cian Ashford	24 September 2004 (age 22)	12	3	(Wales) Cardiff City	v. Denmark, 31 March 2026
FW	Freddie Issaka	28 July 2006 (age 20)	2	0	(England) Gateshead (on loan from Plymouth Argyle)	v. Denmark, 31 March 2026
FW	Adam Brett	20 September 2007 (age 19)	0	0	(England) Brighton & Hove Albion	v. Denmark, 31 March 2026
FW	Chris Popov	26 October 2004 (age 22)	17	3	(England) Hartlepool United	v. Belarus, 14 November 2025
FW	Alex Roberts	17 October 2005 (age 21)	2	0	(England) Spalding United	v. Sweden, 25 March 2025
FW	Tom Tweedy	15 September 2004 (age 22)	2	0	(England) Truro City	v. Sweden, 25 March 2025
FW	Omari Benjamin	4 December 2005 (age 20)	0	0	(England) Everton	v. Andorra, 20 March 2025^{INJ}

Key

- ^{SUS} = Suspended for next match.
- ^{SEN} = Called up to senior squad.
- ^{INJ} = Withdrew from the squad due to injury.
- ^{WD} = Withdrew from the squad for non injury issue.

== See also ==
- UEFA European Under-21 Championship
- Football Association of Wales
- Wales national football team
- Wales national under-20 football team
- Wales national under-19 football team
- Wales national under-18 football team
- Wales national under-17 football team
