= 2011–12 Cardiff City F.C. season =

Welsh football club season

Cardiff City
2011–12 season
- Chairman: Datuk Chan Tien Ghee
- Manager: Malky Mackay
- Stadium: Cardiff City Stadium
- Championship: 6th
- FA Cup: Third round
- League Cup: Runners-up
- Top goalscorer: League: Peter Whittingham (12); All: Peter Whittingham (13)
- Highest home attendance: League: 25,109 vs. Leeds United, 21 April 2012; All: 25,652 vs. Crystal Palace, 24 January 2012
- Lowest home attendance: League: 20,366 vs. Hull City, 13 March 2012; All: 6,829 vs. Huddersfield Town, 23 August 2011
- Average home league attendance: League: 22,139; All: 22,139
Home colours	Away colours	Third colours

The 2011–12 season was the 85th season of competitive association football in the Football League played by Cardiff City Football Club. After suffering defeat in the Championship play-off semi-finals to Reading the previous year, Cardiff competed in the second tier of English football for the eighth consecutive year. The season covers the period between 1 July 2011 and 30 June 2012.

Malky Mackay was appointed manager at the start of the season and signed 9 players in the summer transfer window ahead of his first season in charge of the club. Cardiff occupied a place in the play-offs for the majority of the season and eventually finished the regular season in sixth position. During the season, Cardiff reached the Football League Cup final, however their first final in the competition ended in defeat against Liverpool.

== Background and pre-season ==
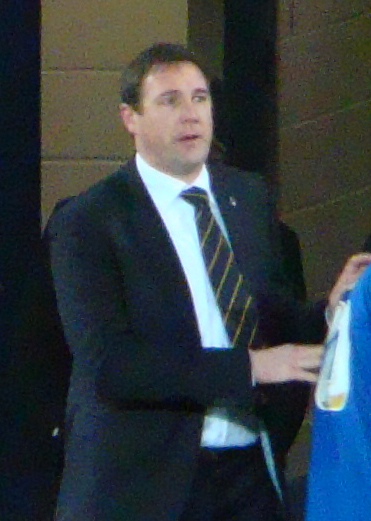
Malky Mackay was appointed as Cardiff manager at the start of the 2010–11 season.

At the end of the 2010–11 season, following a second consecutive defeat in the play-offs, manager Dave Jones was sacked from his position after an end of season review into the club's performance. At the time of his departure, Jones was the longest serving manager in the Championship having held his post since May 2005. The club held talks with former England and Newcastle United captain Alan Shearer to replace Jones but he rejected the job despite stating that he was impressed with the "vision, ambition and determination of the owner Dato Chan Tien Ghee and the board". The Bluebirds instead approached Championship rivals Watford for permission to speak to their manager Malky Mackay, which was initially rejected. However, after the two clubs agreed a compensation fee, Mackay was officially appointed as Dave Jones' replacement on 17 June on a three-year contract. Mackay set about reshaping his coaching staff, allowing assistant manager Terry Burton, first-team coach Paul Wilkinson and fitness coach Alex Armstrong to leave the club, before appointing David Kerslake, Joe McBride and Richard Collinge as their replacements. Goalkeeping coach Martyn Margetson later also left the club to take up the same position at Premier League side West Ham United. Cardiff also appointed Mackay's former Watford colleague Iain Moody as their new head of recruitment.

Players released at the end of the season were Martin John and Gavin Rae, while Jay Bothroyd and Chris Burke also left the club after failing to agree new deals. Adam Matthews departed on a free transfer to Scottish side Celtic, having agreed a pre-contract agreement in February 2011, and striker Michael Chopra was sold to Ipswich Town. During the summer transfer window, Mackay agreed deals to sign free agents Craig Conway, Don Cowie, Robert Earnshaw, Rudy Gestede, Aron Gunnarsson and Andrew Taylor. The club also completed transfers for Joe Mason, for £250,000, Kenny Miller, for a reported £870,000, as well as signing Slovak midfielder Filip Kiss on a season-long loan deal from Slovan Bratislava.

=== Preseason fixtures ===
15 July Friendly	Charlton Athletic	0–1	Cardiff City	Coria del Río
19:30 CEST		Report	Gestede 25'	Stadium: Guadalquivir; Referee: Barea Gonzalez (Spain)

20 July Friendly	Cardiff City	0–1	Celtic	Cardiff
19:45 BST		Report	Stokes 34'	Stadium: Cardiff City Stadium; Attendance: 10,000

23 July Friendly	Bournemouth	2–1	Cardiff City	Bournemouth
13:00 BST	Malone 8'; Lovell 53'	Report	Taylor 58'	Stadium: Dean Court

26 July Friendly	Yeovil Town	1–1	Cardiff City	Yeovil
19:45 BST	Ehmer 52'	Report	18' Whittingham	Stadium: Huish Park; Attendance: 1,377

30 July Friendly	Cardiff City	0–0	Parma	Cardiff
15:00 BST		report		Stadium: Cardiff City Stadium

== Review ==
=== August–September ===
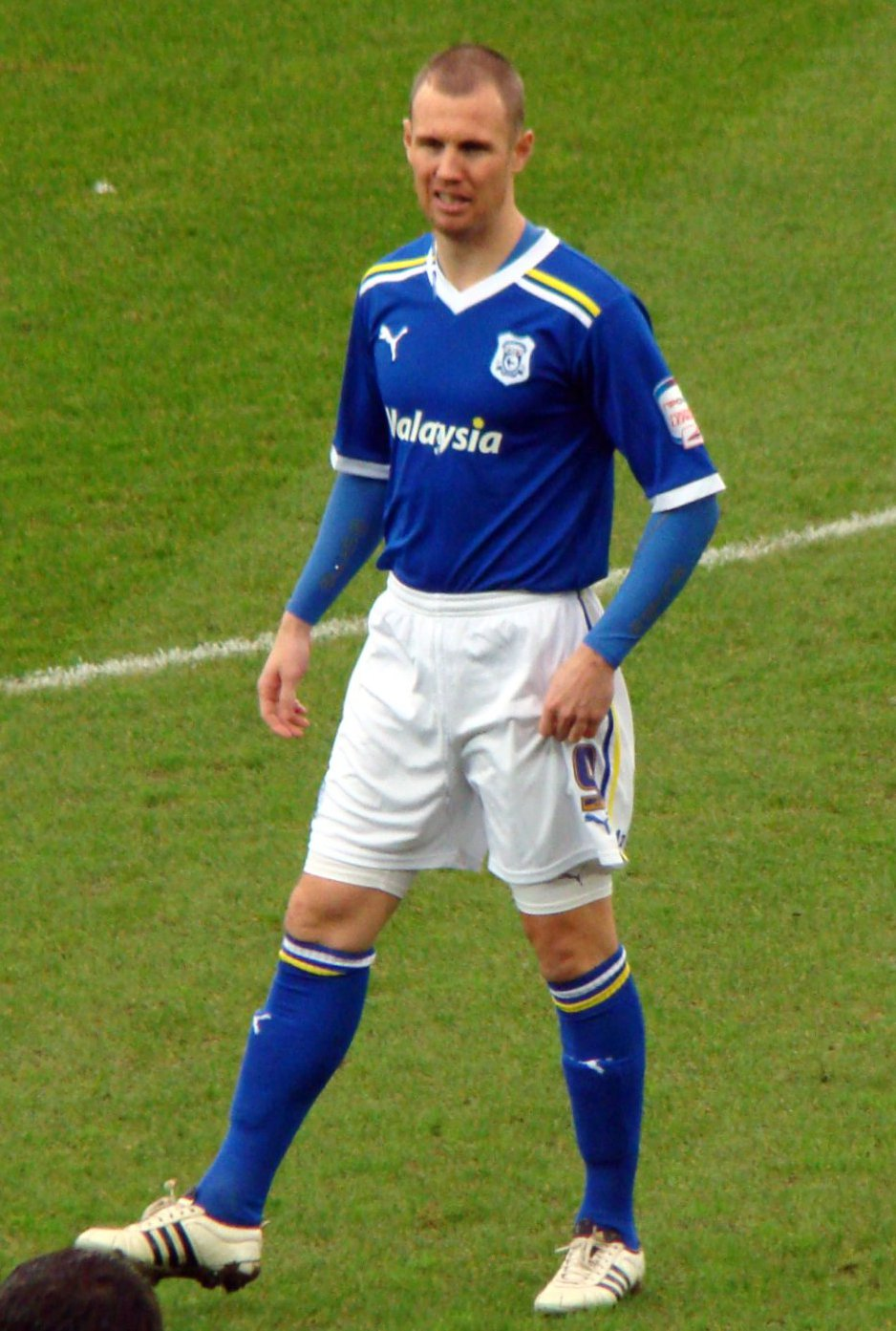
Kenny Miller scored Cardiff's first goal of the season in a 1–0 victory over West Ham United

The opening game of the 2011–12 Football League Championship season saw Cardiff travel to West Ham United, who had been relegated from the Premier League the previous year, with debutant striker Kenny Miller scoring the only goal of the game in the 91st minute to secure a victory for Cardiff. In the following match, the club progressed through to the second round of the Football League Cup after defeating League Two side Oxford United 3–1 in extra-time. The team continued their winning start to the campaign in their first home tie, defeating Bristol City in the first Severnside derby match of the season. Three days later, on 17 August, Cardiff suffered their first defeat of the season, losing 3–1 to Brighton & Hove Albion. Cardiff ended August with two successive away draws in matches against Burnley and Portsmouth and advanced to the third round of the League Cup after a 5–3 victory over Huddersfield Town. On the final day of the summer transfer window, Coventry City defender Ben Turner completed a transfer to the club. As part of the deal, Cardiff striker Jon Parkin had been expected to move to Coventry but, after he failed to agree terms, the move subsequently collapsed, Turner joining Cardiff in a cash-only deal for a fee of £750,000.

At the start of September, prior to an international fixture break, a club record 10 players were called up for international duty by their respective countries. Due to a close affiliation with the country, Malaysian international Safee Sali attended a two-week trial at the club. Cardiff played their first match of the month on 10 September, defeating Doncaster Rovers 2–0 after goals from Anthony Gerrard and Robert Earnshaw. In the following match, a 1–1 draw with Blackpool, Cardiff recorded their third consecutive away draw after Don Cowie had initially given them the lead. Three home matches at the Cardiff City Stadium, a 0–0 draw and a League Cup penalty shoot-out victory over Leicester City and a 2–1 victory over Southampton, ensured Cardiff finished the month of September unbeaten. Striker Jon Parkin left the club on an initial one-month loan move to fellow Championship side Doncaster Rovers and goalkeeper Elliot Parish joined Cardiff from Aston Villa on a loan deal set to last until January 2012.

=== October–November ===
Cardiff suffered their first defeat since mid-August on 1 October, losing 2–1 to Hull City. Youth team graduate Joe Ralls scored the Bluebirds only goal of the game with a volley that was described as "spectacular" in his league debut. Following a two-week international break, Cardiff recorded a 2–2 draw with Ipswich Town, Peter Whittingham equalising from a penalty after Ipswich had taken the lead through former Cardiff player Michael Chopra who had been sold to the club three months earlier. Their following two matches saw a total of 15 goals as Cardiff suffered a 4–3 defeat away to Peterborough United on 18 October before recovering with a 5–3 victory over Barnsley four days later. On the same day as their victory over Barnsley, Chief Executive Gethin Jenkins stepped down from his position on the board. Cardiff defeated Burnley 1–0 in the fourth round of the League Cup following a goal from Joe Mason, reaching the quarter-finals of the League Cup for only the second time in the club's history. In their final match in October, Cardiff drew 1–1 with Leeds United, Mason netting for the third consecutive match.

Cardiff began the month of November with two wins in the space of three days, defeating Derby County and Crystal Palace 3–0 and 2–0 respectively, elevating the team into the play-off places for the first time since the end of September. Following an extended break due to international fixtures, Cardiff recorded a 2–1 win over Reading after goals from Peter Whittingham and captain Mark Hudson. A second Malaysian international, national team captain Safiq Rahim, attended a three-week trial with the club. Rahim had originally been invited on a trial with his teammate Sali in August but was only able to attend in November. Cardiff drew 1–1 with Coventry City on 22 November, having gone ahead from a Peter Whittigham goal, before beating Nottingham Forest 1–0 in their final league game of the month, ending November unbeaten having won four and drawn one league match, a run of form that saw manager Mackay awarded the November Championship manager of the month award. Defender Dekel Keinan left the club on loan to join Crystal Palace on an initial six-week loan deal and Jon Parkin completed his second loan deal of the season by joining Huddersfield Town until January. On 29 November, Cardiff defeated Blackburn Rovers 2–0 in the quarter-final of the League Cup, reaching the semi-final of the competition for the first time since the 1965–66 season.

=== December–January ===
A goal from Kenny Miller secured a 1–0 victory over Birmingham City on 4 December as Cardiff continued their good form, reaching third place in the Championship table, and a 0–0 draw with Millwall saw the side record their ninth consecutive league match without a defeat. One week later, their unbeaten run came to an end as they suffered a 3–2 defeat at home to Middlesbrough, the team's first defeat since 18 October. A late own-goal by Watford defender Adrian Mariappa rescued a 1–1 draw for Cardiff to avoid a second defeat in a row on 26 December in manager Malky Mackay's first match against his former side. Cardiff eventually recorded their first league win since the start of December with a 1–0 victory over Nottingham Forest following a goal from Miller, ending 2011 in fourth position.

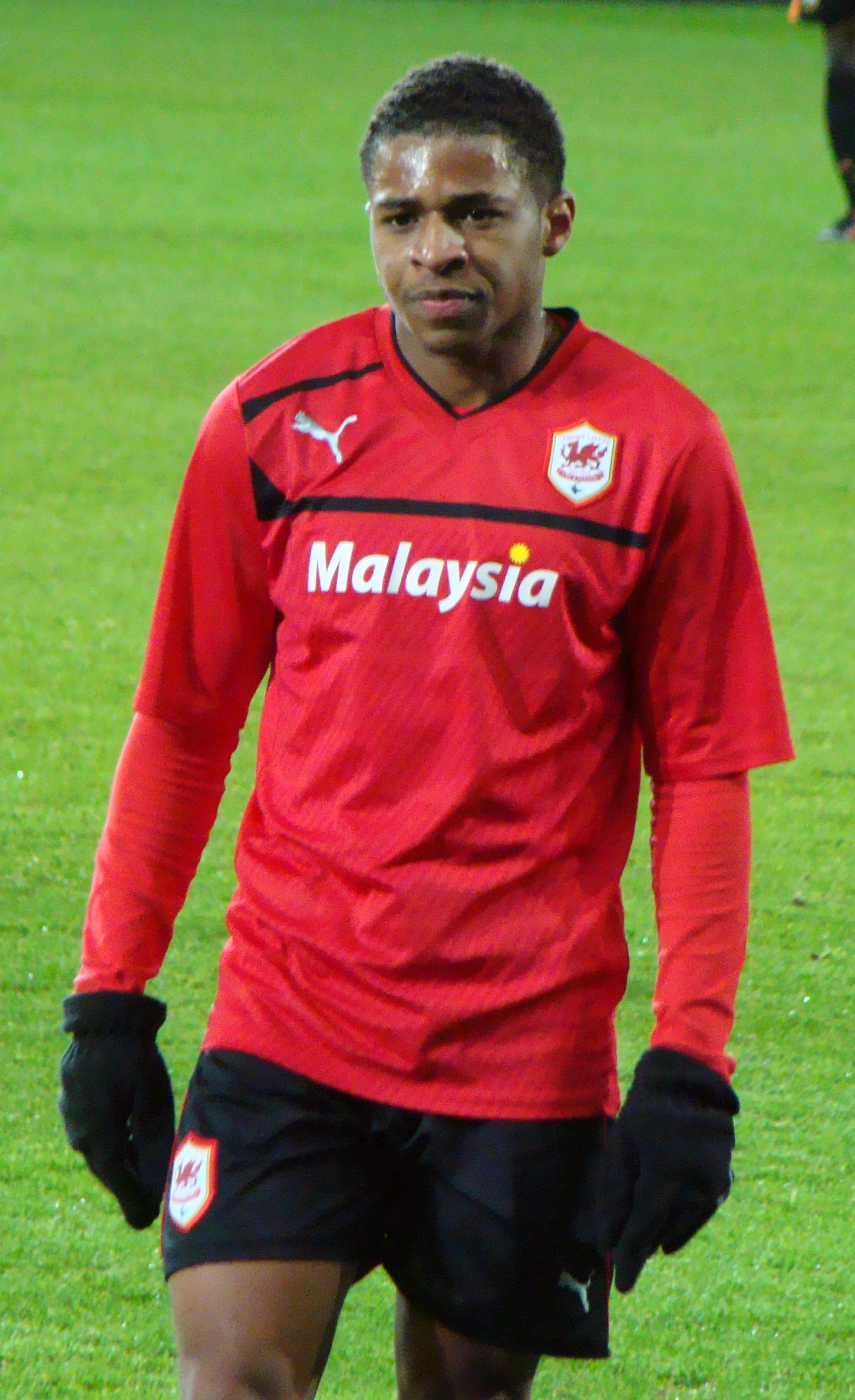
Kadeem Harris was one of two signings made by Cardiff during the winter transfer window.

The club's first match of 2012 ended in a 3–1 victory over Reading following goals from Miller, Mason and Aron Gunnarsson. With the winter transfer window opening at the start of January, Cardiff completed their first signing with Elliot Parish joining the club on a permanent basis having been on loan since September. In the third round of the FA Cup, Cardiff were knocked out of the competition by Premier League side West Bromwich Albion after suffering a 4–2 defeat. On the same day, Cardiff saw a £400,000 bid rejected by Brighton & Hove Albion for winger Craig Noone. Three days later, Cardiff played the first leg of the League Cup semi-final against fellow Championship side Crystal Palace, losing 1–0 at Selhurst Park. Cardiff returned to league action for the first time in two weeks with a 0–0 draw with Doncaster Rovers on 14 January. Cypriot investment banker Mehmet Dalman joined the board, replacing U-Jiun Tan as a director. Cardiff failed in a second attempt to sign a winger after Blackpool rejected a £800,000 bid for Matt Phillips. In the club's last two league matches in January, they recorded a 3–2 victory over Portsmouth and a 1–1 draw with Southampton. On 24 January, in the second leg of the League Cup semi-final, Cardiff defeated Crystal Palace 1–0, following an own-goal from Palace defender Anthony Gardner, leaving the tie at 1–1 after extra-time, resulting in a penalty shoot-out. Cardiff goalkeeper Tom Heaton saved two penalties and Palace's Jonathan Parr missed his penalty to give Cardiff a 3–1 shoot-out victory, Miller the only Cardiff player to fail to score his penalty, reaching the first League Cup final for in the club's history.

In the closing days of the winter transfer window, Cardiff completed their second transfer, signing winger Kadeem Harris from League Two side Wycombe Wanderers for an undisclosed fee and allowed Hungarian defender Gábor Gyepes to leave the club after his contract was cancelled by mutual consent. Jon Parkin left the club for a third time during the season on loan, joining Scunthorpe United, and Solomon Taiwo completed a loan move to Leyton Orient.

=== February–March ===
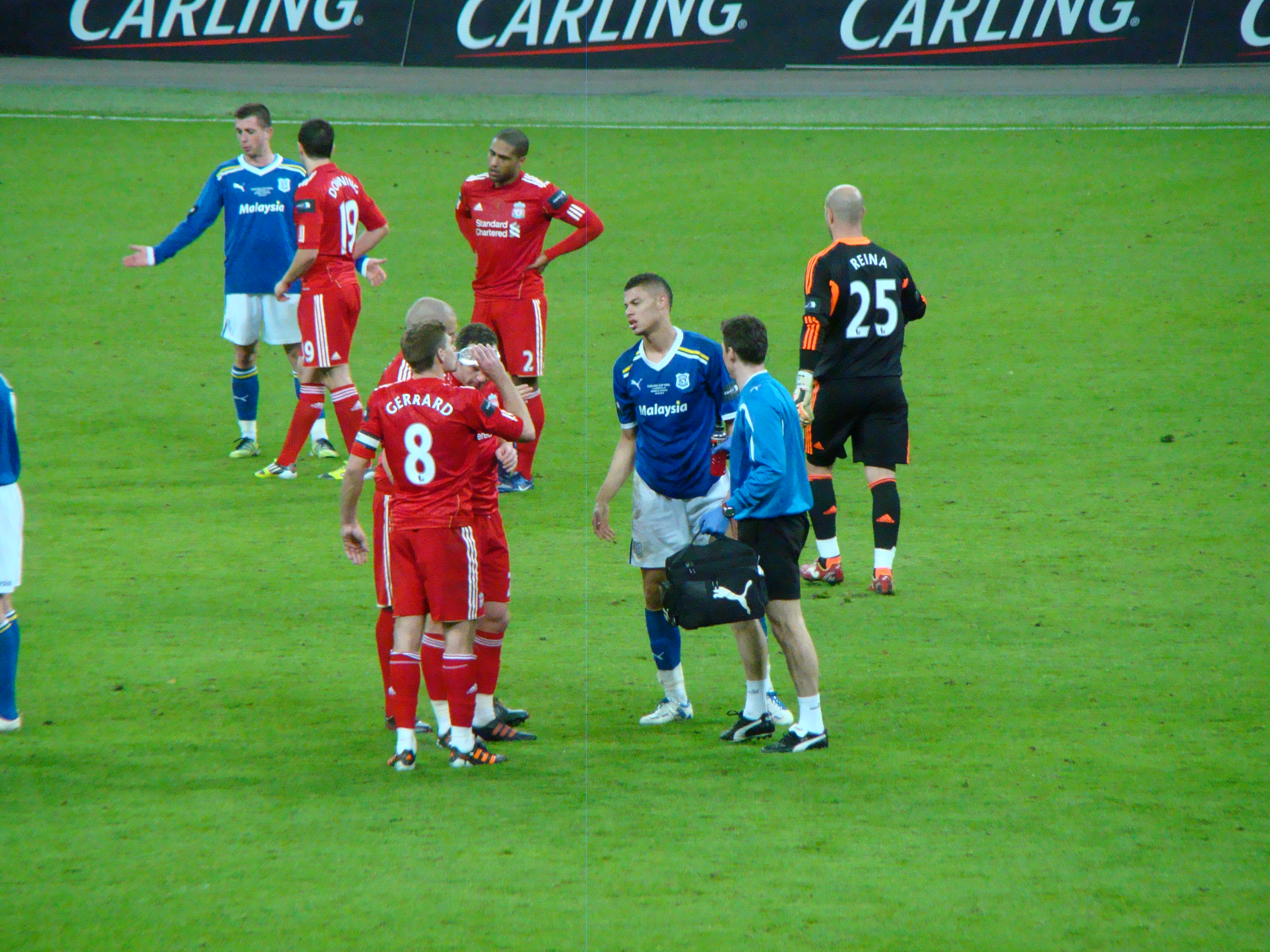
Cardiff City and Liverpool players rest before the start of extra-time during the 2012 Football League Cup Final

Having not lost a game since 17 December, Cardiff opened February with two defeats, losing 3–1 at home against Blackpool, after conceding three goals in the final 11 minutes of the match, and 2–1 to Leicester City, the first time during the season that Cardiff had suffered consecutive defeats. A 3–1 victory over Peterborough United in their following match saw Cardiff briefly return to third place, before a third league defeat of the month against Ipswich Town dropped them back into fourth. Despite suffering 3 defeats in their previous 4 matches, Malky Mackay was handed a three-and-a-half-year contract extension, keeping him at the club till June 2016. On 26 February 2012, Cardiff played Premier League side Liverpool in the 2012 Football League Cup Final at Wembley Stadium, the first League Cup final in the club's history. The Bluebirds took a surprise lead in the opening 20 minutes through Joe Mason but a second-half goal from Liverpool defender Martin Škrtel took the tie into extra-time after 90 minutes. Dirk Kuyt gave Liverpool a 2–1 lead in the 18th minute of extra-time but pressure from Cardiff saw Ben Turner score a late equaliser with two minutes left of the match to take the game to a penalty shoot-out. After 4 penalties for either side, the shoot-out stood at 2–2 before Glen Johnson gave Liverpool the advantage by converting his penalty. Cardiff defender Anthony Gerrard took the final penalty for Cardiff, needing to score to avoid defeat, but hit his penalty wide to hand victory to Liverpool. Despite suffering defeat, Mackay stated that the Cardiff players' performance had "done the club proud".

At the start of March, Cardiff returned to league competition, losing 2–0 to West Ham United, suffering consecutive league defeats for the second time in the space of one month and dropping out of the Championship play-off places for the first time since November 2011. A late goal from Sam Vokes saw Cardiff draw 2–2 with Brighton & Hove Albion in their next match, having led 2–1 going into the final stages of the game. Cardiff claimed a second Severnside derby victory of the season in the following match, beating Bristol City 2–1 with both goals coming from own goals scored by Bristol players. After a defeat to Hull City, Cardiff embarked on run of four consecutive draws, three of which came at home, that left them outside the play-off places in eighth position.

=== April–May ===
Entering April with a four match unbeaten streak, Cardiff continued their form, avoiding defeat in the remaining six matches of the season. This included victories over Middlesbrough, Barnsley, Derby County and Crystal Palace to finish the season in sixth position, securing the final spot in the Championship play-offs. Cardiff were drawn against West Ham, who had finished the season in third position, in the play-off semi-finals. Two goals from Jack Collison gave West Ham a 2–0 advantage in the first-leg and Cardiff were unable to mount a comeback in the second-leg, suffering a 3–0 defeat to lose the semi-final 5–0 on aggregate.

== Football League Championship ==
=== Standings ===
Pos	Team	Pld	W	D	L	GF	GA	GD	Pts	Promotion or relegation
4	Birmingham City	46	20	16	10	78	51	+27	76	Qualification for Championship play-offs
5	Blackpool	46	20	15	11	79	59	+20	75	Qualification for Championship play-offs
6	Cardiff City	46	19	18	9	66	53	+13	75	Qualification for Championship play-offs
7	Middlesbrough	46	18	16	12	52	51	+1	70	
8	Hull City	46	19	11	16	47	44	+3	68	

Updated to match(es) played on 28 April 2012. Source: BBC Sport
Rules for classification: 1) points; 2) goal difference; 3) number of goals scored.

=== Result round by round ===
Round	1	2	3	4	5	6	7	8	9	10	11	12	13	14	15	16	17	18	19	20	21	22	23	24	25	26	27	28	29	30	31	32	33	34	35	36	37	38	39	40	41	42	43	44	45	46
Ground	A	H	H	A	A	H	A	H	H	A	H	A	H	A	A	H	A	A	H	H	A	H	A	A	H	A	H	A	H	A	H	A	H	A	A	H	H	H	A	H	A	H	A	H	H	A
Result	W	W	L	D	D	W	D	D	W	L	D	L	W	D	W	W	W	D	W	W	D	L	D	W	W	D	W	D	L	L	W	L	L	D	W	L	D	D	D	D	W	D	W	W	D	W
Position	7	1	7	8	7	6	6	6	6	9	9	13	8	9	5	4	4	3	3	3	3	5	4	4	3	3	3	3	3	4	3	4	8	8	6	7	8	8	8	8	6	6	6	6	6	6

Updated to match(es) played on 28 April 2012. Source: cardiffcityfc.co.uk
A = Away; H = Home; W = Win; D = Draw; L = Loss
Notes: Hover over letter A for ground's name, letter H means playing at Cardiff City Stadium.

== Kit ==
Supplier: Puma
Sponsor(s): Malaysia

Home	Home Alternate	Away	Away Alternate	Away Alternate 2	Third	GK Home	GK Away	GK Alternate

== Squad ==
No.	Name	Position (s)	Nationality	Place of Birth	Date of birth (age)	Club caps	Club goals	Int. caps	Int. goals	Signed from	Date signed	Fee	Contract End
Goalkeepers
1	David Marshall	GK	(Scotland)	Glasgow	5 March 1985 (aged 27)	65	0	5	0	Norwich City	12 May 2009	£500,000	30 June 2013
22	Tom Heaton	GK	(England)	Chester	15 April 1986 (aged 26)	54	0	–	–	Manchester United	16 June 2010	Free	30 June 2012
29	Elliot Parish	GK	(England)	Northampton	20 May 1990 (aged 22)	–	–	–	–	Aston Villa	3 January 2012	Free	30 June 2013
30	Jordan Santiago	GK	(Canada)	Calgary	3 April 1991 (aged 21)	–	–	–	–	Academy	1 June 2010	Trainee	1 July 2012
Defenders
2	Kevin McNaughton	RB/LB/CB	(Scotland)	Dundee	28 August 1982 (aged 29)	207	2	4	0	Aberdeen	26 May 2006	Free	30 June 2013
3	Andrew Taylor	LB/LM	(England)	Hartlepool	1 August 1986 (aged 25)	–	–	–	–	Middlesbrough	4 July 2011	Free	30 June 2014
5	Mark Hudson	CB	(England)	Guildford	30 March 1982 (aged 30)	79	2	–	–	Charlton Athletic	2 July 2009	£1,075,000	30 June 2014
6	Anthony Gerrard	CB	(England)	Liverpool	6 February 1986 (aged 26)	49	2	–	–	Walsall	2 July 2009	£200,000	30 June 2013
12	Dekel Keinan	CB	(Israel)	Rosh HaNikra	15 September 1984 (aged 27)	20	2	20	0	Blackpool	21 January 2011	£300,000	30 June 2013
14	Paul Quinn	RB/CB	(Scotland)	Wishaw	21 July 1985 (aged 26)	56	1	–	–	Motherwell	4 June 2009	£300,000	30 June 2012
18	Lee Naylor	LB	(England)	Bloxwich	19 March 1980 (aged 32)	31	2	–	–	Celtic	19 August 2010	Free	30 June 2012
21	Jonathan Meades	LB/LM	(Wales)	Cardiff	2 March 1992 (aged 20)	–	–	–	–	Academy	1 June 2009	Trainee	30 June 2012
23	Darcy Blake	CB/RB/DM	(Wales)	New Tredegar	13 December 1988 (aged 23)	90	0	2	0	Academy	1 June 2005	Trainee	30 June 2014
25	Ben Turner	CB	(England)	Birmingham	21 August 1988 (aged 23)	–	–	–	–	Coventry City	31 August 2011	£750,000	30 June 2014
31	Alex Evans	CB	(Wales)	Blackwood	3 May 1991 (aged 21)	–	–	–	–	Academy	1 June 2011	Trainee	30 June 2012
Midfielders
4	Filip Kiss	DM/RM	(Slovakia)	Dunajská Streda	13 October 1990 (aged 21)	–	–	–	–	Slovan Bratislava	21 July 2011	Loan	30 June 2012
7	Peter Whittingham	CM/LM/RM	(England)	Nuneaton	8 September 1984 (aged 27)	211	55	–	–	Aston Villa	11 January 2007	£350,000	30 June 2014
8	Don Cowie	RM/CM	(Scotland)	Inverness	15 February 1983 (aged 29)	–	–	3	0	Watford	1 July 2011	Free	30 June 2014
11	Craig Conway	LW/RW	(Scotland)	Irvine	2 May 1985 (aged 27)	–	–	2	0	Dundee United	23 June 2011	Free	30 June 2014
13	Liam Lawrence	LM/CM	(Republic of Ireland)	Retford (England)	13 December 1981 (aged 30)	–	–	15	2	Portsmouth	2 March 2012	Loan	30 May 2012
17	Aron Gunnarsson	DM/RB	(Iceland)	Akureyri	22 April 1988 (aged 24)	–	–	23	0	Coventry City	8 July 2011	£350,000	30 June 2014
24	Solomon Taiwo	CM/RM	(Nigeria)	Lagos	29 April 1985 (aged 27)	10	0	–	–	Dagenham & Redbridge	25 August 2009	£250,000	30 June 2012
27	Kadeem Harris	LW/RW	(England)	London	29 May 1993 (aged 19)	–	–	–	–	Wycombe Wanderers	30 January 2012	£150,000	30 June 2016
28	Aaron Wildig	CM/LM	(England)	Hereford	15 April 1992 (aged 20)	21	1	–	–	Academy	15 April 2009	Trainee	30 June 2012
32	Ibrahim Farah	CM	(Wales)	Cardiff	24 February 1992 (aged 20)	–	–	–	–	Academy	1 June 2011	Trainee	30 June 2012
37	Stephen McPhail	CM/LM	(Republic of Ireland)	London (England)	9 December 1979 (aged 32)	193	3	10	1	Barnsley	13 June 2006	Free	30 June 2013
52	Joe Ralls	CM/LM	(England)	Aldershot	13 October 1993 (aged 18)	–	–	–	–	Academy	30 September 2011	Trainee	Undisclosed
Forwards
9	Kenny Miller	CF	(Scotland)	Edinburgh	23 December 1979 (aged 32)	–	–	55	14	Bursaspor	26 July 2011	£870,000	30 June 2013
10	Robert Earnshaw	CF/RW	(Wales)	Mufulira (Zambia)	6 April 1981 (aged 31)	205	105	54	16	Nottingham Forest	6 July 2011	Free	30 June 2013
15	Rudy Gestede	CF	(France)	Essey-lès-Nancy	10 November 1988 (aged 23)	–	–	–	–	Metz	26 July 2011	Free	30 June 2014
16	Jon Parkin	CF	(England)	Barnsley	30 January 1981 (aged 31)	13	1	–	–	Preston North End	1 January 2011	£100,000	30 June 2013
20	Joe Mason	CF/LW	(Republic of Ireland)	Plymouth (England)	13 May 1991 (aged 21)	–	–	–	–	Plymouth Argyle	10 July 2011	£250,000	30 June 2016
33	Nathaniel Jarvis	CF	(Wales)	Cardiff	20 October 1991 (aged 20)	–	–	–	–	Academy	1 June 2010	Trainee	30 June 2013

=== Statistics ===
As of 7 May 2012

No.	Pos	Nat	Player	Total		Championship		FA Cup		League Cup		Play-offs	
No.	Pos	Nat	Player	Apps	Goals	Apps	Goals	Apps	Goals	Apps	Goals	Apps	Goals
1	GK	(Scotland) SCO	David Marshall	48	0	45+0	0	0+0	0	1+0	0	2+0	0
2	DF	(Scotland) SCO	Kevin McNaughton	48	0	41+1	0	0+0	0	4+1	0	1+0	0
3	DF	(England) ENG	Andrew Taylor	52	1	42+0	1	0+0	0	7+1	0	2+0	0
4	MF	(Slovakia) SVK	Filip Kiss (on loan from Slovan Bratislava)	33	1	13+13	1	1+0	0	2+3	0	0+1	0
5	DF	(England) ENG	Mark Hudson	44	5	38+1	5	0+0	0	3+0	0	2+0	0
6	DF	(England) ENG	Anthony Gerrard	25	2	18+2	1	1+0	0	3+1	1	0+0	0
7	MF	(England) ENG	Peter Whittingham	55	13	46+0	12	0+0	0	5+2	1	2+0	0
8	MF	(Scotland) SCO	Don Cowie	53	7	44+0	4	0+0	0	7+0	3	1+1	0
9	FW	(Scotland) SCO	Kenny Miller	50	11	41+2	10	0+0	0	4+1	1	2+0	0
10	FW	(Wales) WAL	Robert Earnshaw	22	4	8+11	3	1+0	1	1+0	0	0+1	0
11	MF	(Scotland) SCO	Craig Conway	38	5	24+7	3	1+0	0	5+1	2	0+0	0
13	MF	(Republic of Ireland) IRL	Liam Lawrence (on loan from Portsmouth)	15	1	12+1	1	0+0	0	0+0	0	2+0	0
14	DF	(Scotland) SCO	Paul Quinn	5	0	0+1	0	1+0	0	3+0	0	0+0	0
15	FW	(France) FRA	Rudy Gestede	31	3	5+20	2	1+0	0	4+1	1	0+0	0
17	MF	(Iceland) ISL	Aron Gunnarsson	50	5	41+1	5	0+0	0	5+1	0	2+0	0
18	DF	(England) ENG	Lee Naylor	6	0	2+0	0	1+0	0	2+1	0	0+0	0
20	FW	(Republic of Ireland) IRL	Joe Mason	46	12	24+15	9	0+1	1	4+0	2	2+0	0
21	MF	(Wales) WAL	Jonathan Meades	0	0	0+0	0	0+0	0	0+0	0	0+0	0
22	GK	(England) ENG	Tom Heaton	10	0	1+1	0	1+0	0	7+0	0	0+0	0
23	DF	(Wales) WAL	Darcy Blake	28	0	9+11	0	1+0	0	3+2	0	1+1	0
25	DF	(England) ENG	Ben Turner	43	3	36+1	2	0+0	0	4+0	1	2+0	0
27	MF	(England) ENG	Kadeem Harris	0	0	0+0	0	0+0	0	0+0	0	0+0	0
29	GK	(England) ENG	Elliot Parish	0	0	0+0	0	0+0	0	0+0	0	0+0	0
30	GK	(Canada) CAN	Jordan Santiago	0	0	0+0	0	0+0	0	0+0	0	0+0	0
31	DF	(Wales) WAL	Alex Evans	1	0	0+0	0	0+0	0	1+0	0	0+0	0
32	MF	(Wales) WAL	Ibrahim Farah	1	0	0+0	0	0+0	0	1+0	0	0+0	0
37	MF	(Republic of Ireland) IRL	Stephen McPhail	27	0	11+8	0	1+0	0	3+2	0	1+1	0
38	DF	(England) ENG	Adedeji Oshilaja	0	0	0+0	0	0+0	0	0+0	0	0+0	0
40	MF	(Wales) WAL	Theo Wharton	1	0	0+0	0	0+1	0	0+0	0	0+0	0
52	MF	(England) ENG	Joe Ralls	14	1	5+5	1	0+0	0	2+2	0	0+0	0
Players currently out on loan:
12	DF	(Israel) ISR	Dekel Keinan (at Crystal Palace)	4	0	0+1	0	1+0	0	2+0	0	0+0	0
16	FW	(England) ENG	Jon Parkin (at Scunthorpe United)	2	1	0+0	0	0+0	0	2+0	1	0+0	0
24	MF	(Nigeria) NGR	Solomon Taiwo (at Leyton Orient)	2	0	0+1	0	0+0	0	1+0	0	0+0	0
28	MF	(England) ENG	Aaron Wildig (at Shrewsbury Town)	0	0	0+0	0	0+0	0	0+0	0	0+0	0
33	FW	(Wales) WAL	Nathaniel Jarvis (at Newport County)	1	1	0+0	0	0+0	0	0+1	1	0+0	0
Players featured for club who have left:
	DF	(Hungary) HUN	Gábor Gyepes	2	1	0+0	0	0+0	0	2+0	1	0+0	0
	MF	(Slovenia) SLO	Haris Vučkić (on loan from Newcastle United)	5	1	2+3	1	0+0	0	0+0	0	0+0	0

==== Captains ====
No.	P	Name	Country	No. games	Notes
5	DF	Mark Hudson	(England)	43	Club captain
2	DF	Kevin McNaughton	(Scotland)	4	
7	MF	Peter Whittingham	(England)	4	
14	DF	Paul Quinn	(Scotland)	3	
37	MF	Stephen McPhail	(Republic of Ireland)	3	

Last updated: 18 February 2012
Source: Competitive match reports.
Competitive matches only
Matches started as captain only
Country: FIFA nationality; No.: Squad number; P: Position; Name: Player name; No. Games: Number of games started as captain.

==== Goals & Assist record ====
Rank	No.	Po.	Name	Championship	FA Cup	League Cup	Play-offs	Total
1	7	MF	Peter Whittingham	12	0	1	0	13
2	20	FW	Joe Mason	9	1	2	0	12
3	9	FW	Kenny Miller	10	0	1	0	11
4	8	MF	Don Cowie	4	0	3	0	7
5	Own Goals			5	0	1	0	6
6	11	MF	Craig Conway	3	0	2	0	5
6	17	MF	Aron Gunnarsson	5	0	0	0	5
6	5	DF	Mark Hudson	5	0	0	0	5
9	10	FW	Robert Earnshaw	3	1	0	0	4
10	15	FW	Rudy Gestede	2	0	1	0	3
10	25	DF	Ben Turner	2	0	1	0	3
12	6	DF	Anthony Gerrard	1	0	1	0	2
13
13	~~19~~	DF	Gábor Gyepes	0	0	1	0	1
13	33	FW	Nathaniel Jarvis	0	0	1	0	1
13	4	MF	Filip Kiss	1	0	0	0	1
13	13	MF	Liam Lawrence	1	0	0	0	1
13	16	FW	Jon Parkin	0	0	1	0	1
13	52	MF	Joe Ralls	1	0	0	0	1
13	3	DF	Andrew Taylor	1	0	0	0	1
13	~~19~~	MF	Haris Vučkić	1	0	0	0	1
Total				66	2	16	0	84

==== Disciplinary record ====
No.	Pos.	Name	Championship		FA Cup		League Cup		Play-offs		Total	
No.	Pos.	Name	Yellow card	Red card	Yellow card	Red card	Yellow card	Red card	Yellow card	Red card	Yellow card	Red card
5	DF	Mark Hudson	7	0	0	0	0	0	1	0	8	0
2	DF	Kevin McNaughton	5	0	0	0	2	0	0	0	7	0
7	MF	Peter Whittingham	6	0	0	0	0	0	1	0	7	0
8	MF	Don Cowie	6	0	0	0	0	0	0	0	6	0
6	DF	Anthony Gerrard	4	0	0	0	2	0	0	0	6	0
17	MF	Aron Gunnarsson	5	0	0	0	1	0	0	0	6	0
4	MF	Filip Kiss	4	0	0	0	1	0	0	0	5	0
3	DF	Andrew Taylor	4	0	0	0	0	0	0	0	4	0
25	DF	Ben Turner	3	0	0	0	1	0	0	0	4	0
23	DF	Darcy Blake	1	0	0	0	2	0	0	0	3	0
13	MF	Liam Lawrence	3	0	0	0	0	0	0	0	3	0
1	GK	David Marshall	3	0	0	0	0	0	0	0	3	0
9	FW	Kenny Miller	2	0	0	0	0	0	1	0	3	0
37	MF	Stephen McPhail	1	0	1	0	0	0	0	0	2	0
11	MF	Craig Conway	1	0	0	0	0	0	0	0	1	0
32	MF	Ibrahim Farah	0	0	0	0	1	0	0	0	1	0
15	FW	Rudy Gestede	1	0	0	0	0	0	0	0	1	0
33	FW	Nathaniel Jarvis	0	0	0	0	1	0	0	0	1	0
12	DF	Dekel Keinan	0	0	0	0	1	0	0	0	1	0
20	FW	Joe Mason	1	0	0	0	0	0	0	0	1	0
18	DF	Lee Naylor	1	0	0	0	0	0	0	0	1	0
16	FW	Jon Parkin	0	0	0	0	1	0	0	0	1	0
14	DF	Paul Quinn	0	0	0	0	1	0	0	0	1	0
52	MF	Joe Ralls	0	0	0	0	1	0	0	0	1	0
Total			58	0	1	0	15	0	0	0	74	0

==== Suspensions served ====
Date	Matches Missed	Player	Reason	Opponents Missed
25 October	1	Anthony Gerrard	5× (yellow card)	Leeds United (A)

Key: (H) = League Home, (A) = League Away, (FA) = FA Cup, (CC) = League Cup

=== International call-ups ===
No.	P	Name	Country	Level	Caps	Goals	Notes	Source
1	GK	David Marshall	Scotland	Senior	0	0		
2	DF	Kevin McNaughton	Scotland	Senior	0	0		
4	MF	Filip Kiss	Slovakia	U-21	3	0		
8	MF	Don Cowie	Scotland	Senior	7	0		
9	ST	Kenny Miller	Scotland	Senior	5	2		
10	ST	Robert Earnshaw	Wales	Senior	4	0		
11	MF	Craig Conway	Scotland	Senior	1	0		
12	DF	Dekel Keinan	Israel	Senior	1	0		
17	MF	Aron Gunnarsson	Iceland	Senior	5	0		
19	MF	Haris Vučkić	Slovenia	Senior	1	0		
20	ST	Joe Mason	Ireland	U-21	2	0		
21	MF	Jonathan Meades	Wales	U-21	1	0		
23	DF	Darcy Blake	Wales	Senior	7	1		
31	DF	Alex Evans	Wales	U-21	1	0		
52	MF	Joe Ralls	England	U-19	1	0		

=== Contracts ===
No.	Pos.	Nat.	Name	Age	Status	Contract length	Expiry date	Source
21	MF	(Wales)	Jonathan Meades	19	Signed	1 year	June 2012	Official Site
30	GK	(Canada)	Jordan Santiago	20	Signed	1 year	June 2012	Official Site
7	MF	(England)	Peter Whittingham	26	Signed	3 years	June 2014	BBC Sport
33	FW	(Wales)	Nathaniel Jarvis	20	Signed	1 year	June 2013	
5	DF	(England)	Mark Hudson	29	Signed	2 years	June 2014	Official Site
15	FW	(France)	Rudy Gestede	23	Signed	2 years	June 2014	Official Site
20	FW	(Republic of Ireland) (England)	Joe Mason	20	Signed	4 years	June 2016	BBC Sport

== Transfers ==
=== In ===
No.	Pos.	Nat.	Name	Age	EU	Moving from	Type	Transfer window	Ends	Transfer fee	Source
11	MF	(Scotland)	Craig Conway	26	EU	Dundee United (Scotland)	Free transfer	Summer	2014	Free	Official Site
8	MF	(Scotland)	Don Cowie	28	EU	Watford (England)	Free transfer	Summer	2014	Free	BBC Sport
3	DF	(England)	Andrew Taylor	24	EU	Middlesbrough (England)	Free transfer	Summer	2014	Free	Official Site
10	FW	(Wales) (Zambia)	Robert Earnshaw	30	EU	Nottingham Forest (England)	Free transfer	Summer	2013	Free	Official Site
17	MF	(Iceland)	Aron Gunnarsson	22	EU	Coventry City (England)	Free transfer	Summer	2014	£350,000^{1}	Official Site
20	FW	(Republic of Ireland) (England)	Joe Mason	20	EU	Plymouth Argyle (England)	Transfer	Summer	2014	£250,000^{2}	Official Site
9	FW	(Scotland)	Kenny Miller	31	EU	Bursaspor (Turkey)	Transfer	Summer	2013	£870,000	BBC Sport
15	FW	(France)	Rudy Gestede	22	EU	Metz (France)	Free transfer	Summer	2012	Free	Official Site
25	DF	(England)	Ben Turner	23	EU	Coventry City (England)	Transfer	Summer	2014	£750,000^{3}	Official Site
52	MF	(England)	Joe Ralls	17	EU	Youth system	Promoted		2015	Youth system	Official Site
29	GK	(England)	Elliott Parish	21	EU	Aston Villa (England)	Transfer	Winter	2013	Free	Sky Sports
27	MF	(England)	Kadeem Harris	18	EU	Wycombe Wanderers (England)	Transfer	Winter	2015	£150,000^{4}	Official Site

- Total spending: ▼ ~ £2,370,000

Notes

^{1}Despite being a free transfer, Cardiff paid £350,000 compensation fee for Gunnarsson because he is under 24.
^{2}Although officially undisclosed, BBC Sport reported the fee to be around £250,000.
^{3}Although officially undisclosed, South Wales Echo reported the fee to be £750,000.
^{4}Although officially undisclosed, South Wales Echo reported the fee to be around £150,000.

=== Loans in ===
No.	Pos.	Name	Country	Age	Loan club	Started	Ended	Start source	End source
4	MF	Filip Kiss	(Slovakia)	21	Slovan Bratislava	21 July	31 May	BBC Sport	BBC Sport
29	GK	Elliot Parish	(England)	21	Aston Villa	23 September	3 January	Official Site	Sky Sports
19	MF	Haris Vučkić	(Slovenia)	19	Newcastle United	10 February	12 March	Official site	BBC Sport
13	MF	Liam Lawrence	(Republic of Ireland) (England)	30	Portsmouth	2 March	21 May	Official Site	Sky Sports

Sources: For loan start source see "Start source". For loan end source see "End source".
EU = if holds or not a European Union passport; Country: when 2 flags, 1st flag = country that plays for internationally, 2nd flag = country of birth; No. = number on jersey; P = Position (for position name, pause mouse pointer on abbreviation); Name = Name on jersey (for more extensive name, pause mouse pointer on name); In/Out = In: The player came in on loan, Out: The player went out on loan; Loan club = the club that the player moved on loan to or the club that the player came from on loan; Started = the date when the player's loan started; Ended = the date when the player's loan ended.

=== Out ===
No.	Pos.	Name	Country	Age	Type	Moving to	Transfer window	Transfer fee	Apps	Goals	Source
27	DF	Adam Matthews	(Wales)	19	Transfer	Celtic (Scotland)	Summer	Free	48	1	BBC Sport
11	MF	Chris Burke	(Scotland)	27	Contracted Ended	Birmingham City (England)	Summer	Free	121	16	Sky Sports
26	DF	Martin John	(England)	22	Contract ended	Free agent	Summer	N/A	1	0	Official Site
4	MF	Gavin Rae	(Scotland)	33	Contract ended	Dundee (Scotland)	Summer	Free	153	8	South Wales Echo
8	FW	Michael Chopra	(England)	27	Transfer	Ipswich Town (England)	Summer	£1,000,000^{1}	162	65	BBC Sport
9	FW	Jay Bothroyd	(England)	28	Contract ended	Queens Park Rangers (England)	Summer	Free	136	46	BBC Sport
19	DF	Gábor Gyepes	(Hungary)	30	Contract terminated	Free agent	Winter	Free	74	5	CCFC Official Site

EU = if holds or not a European Union passport; Country: when 2 flags, 1st flag = country that plays for internationally, 2nd flag = country of birth; N = number on jersey; P = Position (for position name, pause mouse pointer on abbreviation); Name = Name on jersey (for more extensive name, pause mouse pointer on name); Age = age on the day of the signing; Moving from = only indicate the club the player was playing before start playing for this club in this season, for the type of the moving see Status column; Moving to = only indicates the club the player is going to play next, for the type of the moving see Status column; Ends = when the player's current contract ends; n/a = Not applicable.

- Total income: ▲ ~ £1,000,000

Notes
^{1}The fee was officially believed to be £1.5 million, Ipswich Town manager Paul Jewell revealed the fee to be £1 million.

=== Loans out ===
No.	Pos.	Name	Country	Age	Loan club	Started	Ended	Start source	End source
33	FW	Jarvis	(Wales)	20	Newport County	9 September	25 November	Official Site	South Wales Echo
16	FW	Parkin	(England)	29	Doncaster Rovers	21 September	24 October	Sky Sports	BBC Sport
28	MF	Wildig	(England)	20	Shrewsbury Town	8 November	30 June	Official Site	
12	DF	Keinan	(Israel)	27	Crystal Palace	21 November	2 January	Official Site	BBC
16	FW	Parkin	(England)	30	Huddersfield Town	23 November	23 January	Official Site	HTFC Official Site
32	MF	Farah	(Wales)	19	Tamworth	24 November	1 January	BBC Sport	BBC Sport
33	FW	Jarvis	(Wales)	20	Newport County	1 January	30 June		
24	MF	Taiwo	(Nigeria)	27	Leyton Orient	26 January	30 June	BBC Sport	
16	FW	Parkin	(England)	30	Scunthorpe United	31 January	30 June	CCFC Official Site	
12	DF	Keinan	(Israel)	27	Bristol City	22 March	30 May	BBC Sport	

Sources: For loan start source see "Start source". For loan end source see "End source".
EU = if holds or not a European Union passport; Country: when 2 flags, 1st flag = country that plays for internationally, 2nd flag = country of birth; No. = number on jersey; P = Position (for position name, pause mouse pointer on abbreviation); Name = Name on jersey (for more extensive name, pause mouse pointer on name); In/Out = In: The player came in on loan, Out: The player went out on loan; Loan club = the club that the player moved on loan to or the club that the player came from on loan; Started = the date when the player's loan started; Ended = the date when the player's loan ended.

== Fixtures and results ==
=== Championship ===
7 August 1	West Ham United	0–1	Cardiff City	London
13:00 BST		report	90+1' Miller	Stadium: Boleyn Ground; Attendance: 25,680; Referee: Howard Webb

14 August 2	Cardiff City	3–1	Bristol City	Cardiff
15:00 BST	Hudson 18'; Conway 23'; Earnshaw 36'	report	82' Maynard	Stadium: Cardiff City Stadium; Attendance: 22,639; Referee: Graham Salisbury

17 August 3	Cardiff City	1–3	Brighton & Hove Albion	Cardiff
19:45 BST	Whittingham 90' (pen.)	report	39', 63' (pen.) Barnes; 87' Hoskins	Stadium: Cardiff City Stadium; Attendance: 23,013; Referee: Keith Stroud

20 August 4	Burnley	1–1	Cardiff City	Burnley
15:00 BST	Austin 2'	report	40' Earnshaw	Stadium: Turf Moor; Attendance: 13,428; Referee: Anthony Bates

27 August 5	Portsmouth	1–1	Cardiff City	Portsmouth
15:00 BST	Kanu 80'	report	76' Taylor	Stadium: Fratton Park; Attendance: 14,354; Referee: Andy Woolmer

10 September 6	Cardiff City	2–0	Doncaster Rovers	Cardiff
15:00 BST	Gerrard 52'; Earnshaw 70'	report		Stadium: Cardiff City Stadium; Attendance: 21,863; Referee: Kevin Wright

17 September 7	Blackpool	1–1	Cardiff City	Blackpool
15:00 BST	K Phillips 62'	report	49' Cowie	Stadium: Bloomfield Road; Attendance: 12,798; Referee: Jon Moss

25 September 8	Cardiff City	0–0	Leicester City	Cardiff
15:00 BST		report		Stadium: Cardiff City Stadium; Attendance: 21,154; Referee: Mark Haywood

28 September 9	Cardiff City	2–1	Southampton	Cardiff
19:45 BST	Miller 56', 63'	report	90+3' De Ridder	Stadium: Cardiff City Stadium; Attendance: 22,502; Referee: Philip Gibbs

1 October 10	Hull City	2–1	Cardiff City	Kingston upon Hull
15:00 BST	Fryatt 39'; Barmby 71'	report	62' Ralls	Stadium: KC Stadium; Attendance: 18,305; Referee: Colin Webster

15 October 11	Cardiff City	2–2	Ipswich Town	Cardiff
15:00 BST	Gestede 19'; Whittingham 72' (pen.)	report	30' Scotland; 52' Chopra	Stadium: Cardiff City Stadium; Attendance: 21,809; Referee: Dean Whitestone

18 October 12	Peterborough United	4–3	Cardiff City	Peterborough
19:45 BST	Boyd 21'; McCann 24', 87' (pen.); Taylor 90+2'	report	6' Cowie; 60' Whittingham; 79' Gunnarsson	Stadium: London Road Stadium; Attendance: 6,351; Referee: Nigel Miller

22 October 13	Cardiff City	5–3	Barnsley	Cardiff
15:00 BST	Miller 10'; Mason 34'; Gunnarsson 38', 71'; Cowie 60'	report	36' Drinkwater; 82' McNulty; 86' Vaz Tê	Stadium: Cardiff City Stadium; Attendance: 20,665; Referee: Scott Mathieson

30 October 14	Leeds United	1–1	Cardiff City	Leeds
13:15 BST	Snodgrass 73'	report	17' Mason	Stadium: Elland Road; Attendance: 20,270; Referee: Phil Dowd

2 November 15	Derby County	0–3	Cardiff City	Derby
19:45 GMT		report	20' Kiss; 62' (o.g.) Kilbane; 73' Whittingham	Stadium: Pride Park Stadium; Attendance: 23,078; Referee: Eddie Ilderton

5 November 16	Cardiff City	2–0	Crystal Palace	Cardiff
15:00 GMT	Miller 69'; Whittingham 80'	report		Stadium: Cardiff City Stadium; Attendance: 22,032; Referee: Steve Rushton

19 November 17	Reading	1–2	Cardiff City	Reading
15:00 GMT	Kébé 77'	report	2' Whittingham; 70' Hudson	Stadium: Madjeski Stadium; Attendance: 20,361; Referee: Darren Sheldrake

22 November 18	Coventry City	1–1	Cardiff City	Coventry
19:45 GMT	Jutkiewicz 61'	report	48' Whittingham	Stadium: Ricoh Arena; Attendance: 12,317; Referee: Darren Drysdale

26 November 19	Cardiff City	1–0	Nottingham Forest	Cardiff
15:00 GMT	Mason 70'	report		Stadium: Cardiff City Stadium; Attendance: 22,556; Referee: David Phillips

4 December 20	Cardiff City	1–0	Birmingham City	Cardiff
12:30 GMT	Miller 68'	report	(yellow card) 63' (yellow-red card) Davies	Stadium: Cardiff City Stadium; Attendance: 22,010; Referee: Anthony Taylor

10 December 21	Millwall	0–0	Cardiff City	London
15:00 GMT		report		Stadium: The Den; Attendance: 11,314; Referee: Gavin Ward

17 December 22	Cardiff City	2–3	Middlesbrough	Cardiff
15:00 GMT	Turner 23'; Gunnarsson 44'	report	15' Ogbeche; 60' McDonald; 76' Haroun	Stadium: Cardiff City Stadium; Attendance: 23,373; Referee: Graham Salisbury

26 December 23	Watford	1–1	Cardiff City	Watford
12:00 GMT	Bauben 62'	report	80' (o.g.) Mariappa	Stadium: Vicarage Road; Attendance: 14,604; Referee: Patrick Miller

31 December 24	Nottingham Forest	0–1	Cardiff City	Nottingham
15:00 GMT		report	59' Miller	Stadium: City Ground; Attendance: 19,750; Referee: Andy Woolmer

2 January 25	Cardiff City	3–1	Reading	Cardiff
15:00 GMT	Mason 13'; Gunnarsson 19'; Miller 36'	report	45' McAnuff	Stadium: Cardiff City Stadium; Attendance: 23,655; Referee: Chris Foy

14 January 26	Doncaster Rovers	0–0	Cardiff City	Doncaster
15:00 GMT		report		Stadium: Keepmoat Stadium; Attendance: 8,834; Referee: Oliver Langford

21 January 27	Cardiff City	3–2	Portsmouth	Cardiff
15:00 GMT	Miller 15'; Hudson 69'; Conway 90+2'	report	39' Futács; 49' Halford	Stadium: Cardiff City Stadium; Attendance: 22,199; Referee: Steve Tanner

31 January 28	Southampton	1–1	Cardiff City	Southampton
19:45 GMT	Lambert 57' (pen.)	report	36' Conway	Stadium: St Mary's Stadium; Attendance: 24,356; Referee: Mark Haywood

4 February 29	Cardiff City	1–3	Blackpool	Cardiff
15:00 GMT	Mason 59'	report	79' K Phillips; 83', 90' M Phillips	Stadium: Cardiff City Stadium; Attendance: 22,577; Referee: Keith Stroud

11 February 30	Leicester City	2–1	Cardiff City	Leicester
15:00 GMT	Gallagher 41' (pen.), 71'	report	77' (pen.) Whittingham	Stadium: Walkers Stadium; Attendance: 21,375; Referee: Mark Halsey

14 February 31	Cardiff City	3–1	Peterborough United	Cardiff
19:45 GMT	Whittingham 34'; Gestede 38'; Vučkić 40'	report	90' Taylor	Stadium: Cardiff City Stadium; Attendance: 21,342; Referee: Michael Naylor

18 February 32	Ipswich Town	3–0	Cardiff City	Ipswich
15:00 GMT	Martin 21', 73'; Chopra 48'	report		Stadium: Portman Road; Attendance: 17,032; Referee: Simon Hooper

25 February	Cardiff City	– Postponed due to League Cup Final	Hull City	Cardiff
15:00 GMT				Stadium: Cardiff City Stadium

4 March 33	Cardiff City	0–2	West Ham United	Cardiff
12:45 GMT		report	43' Nolan; 77' McCartney	Stadium: Cardiff City Stadium; Attendance: 23,872; Referee: Chris Foy

7 March 34	Brighton & Hove Albion	2–2	Cardiff City	Brighton
19:45 GMT	Barnes 72'; Vokes 89'	report	52' Mason; 74' Whittingham	Stadium: AMEX Stadium; Attendance: 18,786; Referee: Roger East

10 March 35	Bristol City	1–2	Cardiff City	Bristol
17:20 GMT	Stead 52'	report	45+3' (o.g.) McManus; 87' (o.g.) Cissé	Stadium: Ashton Gate Stadium; Attendance: 12,495; Referee: Michael Oliver

13 March 36	Cardiff City	0–3	Hull City	Cardiff
19:45 GMT		report	6' (o.g.) McNaughton; 47' Chester; 55' McLean	Stadium: Cardiff City Stadium; Attendance: 20,366; Referee: Graham Scott

18 March 37	Cardiff City	0–0	Burnley	Cardiff
15:00 GMT		report		Stadium: Cardiff City Stadium; Attendance: 21,276; Referee: Iain Williamson

21 March 38	Cardiff City	2–2	Coventry City	Cardiff
19:45 GMT	McDonald 18' (o.g.); Whittingham 83'	report	69' Clarke; 90+5' Norwood	Stadium: Cardiff City Stadium; Attendance: 20,564; Referee: Bobby Madley

25 March 39	Birmingham City	1–1	Cardiff City	Birmingham
12:00 GMT	Huseklepp 68'	report	78' Hudson	Stadium: St Andrew's; Attendance: 17,704; Referee: Andy D'Urso

31 March 40	Cardiff City	0–0	Millwall	Cardiff
12:30 GMT		report		Stadium: Cardiff City Stadium; Attendance: 21,259; Referee: Anthony Bates

7 April 41	Middlesbrough	0–2	Cardiff City	Middlesbrough
15:00 BST		report	11' Turner; 19' Mason	Stadium: Riverside Stadium; Attendance: 17,564; Referee: Kevin Friend

9 April 42	Cardiff City	1–1	Watford	Cardiff
15:00 BST	Miller 45'	report	82' Nosworthy	Stadium: Cardiff City Stadium; Attendance: 21,259; Referee: Darren Deadman

14 April 43	Barnsley	0–1	Cardiff City	Barnsley
15:00 BST		report	69' Lawrence	Stadium: Oakwell; Attendance: 9,122; Referee: Geoff Eltringham

17 April 44	Cardiff City	2–0	Derby County	Cardiff
19:45 BST	Mason 24'; Hudson 63'	report		Stadium: Cardiff City Stadium; Attendance: 21,216; Referee: Lee Probert

21 April 45	Cardiff City	1–1	Leeds United	Cardiff
12:30 BST	Mason 41'	report	73' Becchio	Stadium: Cardiff City Stadium; Attendance: 25,109; Referee: Mark Halsey

28 April 46	Crystal Palace	1–2	Cardiff City	London
12:30 BST	Zaha 13'	report	53' Whittingham; 62' Cowie	Stadium: Selhurst Park; Attendance: 15,510; Referee: Lee Mason

=== Championship play-offs ===
3 May 1st Leg	Cardiff City	0–2 (0–2 agg.)	West Ham United	Cardiff
19:45 BST		report	9', 41' Collison	Stadium: Cardiff City Stadium; Attendance: 23,029; Referee: Neil Swarbrick

7 May 2nd Leg	West Ham United	3–0 (5–0 agg.)	Cardiff City	London
16:30 BST	Nolan 15'; Vaz Tê 40'; Maynard 90'	report		Stadium: Boleyn Ground; Attendance: 34,682; Referee: Mike Dean

=== FA Cup ===
7 January Round Three	West Bromwich Albion	4–2	Cardiff City	West Bromwich
15:00 GMT	Odemwingie 7'; Cox 33', 61', 90'	report	36' Earnshaw; 50' Mason	Stadium: The Hawthorns; Attendance: 12,454; Referee: Lee Probert

=== League Cup ===
10 August Round One	Oxford United	1–3 (a.e.t.)	Cardiff City	Oxford
19:45 BST	Clist 30'	report	12' Conway; 98' Whittingham; 120+1' Jarvis	Stadium: Kassam Stadium; Attendance: 5,435; Referee: Andy D'Urso

23 August Round Two	Cardiff City	5–3 (a.e.t.)	Huddersfield Town	Cardiff
19:45 BST	Gyepes 16'; Parkin 17'; Cowie 90+3', 117'; Conway 96'	report	53', 88' Rhodes; 70' Ward	Stadium: Cardiff City Stadium; Attendance: 6,829; Referee: James Linington

21 September Round Three	Cardiff City	2–2 (a.e.t.) (7–6 p)	Leicester City	Cardiff
19:45 BST	Cowie 33'; Gestede 82'	report	40' Howard; 66' Dyer	Stadium: Cardiff City Stadium; Attendance: 8,697; Referee: Roger East
	Penalties
	Naylor (penalty scored); Earnshaw (penalty scored); Cowie (penalty scored); Conway (penalty scored); Kiss (penalty scored); Gestede (penalty scored); Quinn (penalty scored)		(penalty scored) Dyer; (penalty scored) Howard; (penalty scored) Abe; (penalty scored) Danns; (penalty scored) St Ledger; (penalty scored) Paintsil; (penalty missed) Fernandes

25 October Round Four	Cardiff City	1–0	Burnley	Cardiff
19:45 BST	Mason 40'	report		Stadium: Cardiff City Stadium; Attendance: 11,601; Referee: Darren Deadman

29 November Quarter Finals	Cardiff City	2–0	Blackburn Rovers	Cardiff
19:45 GMT	Miller 19'; Gerrard 50'	report		Stadium: Cardiff City Stadium; Attendance: 19,436; Referee: Martin Atkinson

10 January Semi-finals 1st leg	Crystal Palace	1–0	Cardiff City	London
20:00 GMT	Gardner 43'	report		Stadium: Selhurst Park; Attendance: 22,147; Referee: Mike Dean

24 January Semi-finals 2nd leg	Cardiff City	1–0 (a.e.t.) (1–1 agg.) (3–1 p)	Crystal Palace	Cardiff
19:45 GMT	Gardner 7' (o.g.)	report	(yellow card) 55' (yellow-red card) 78' McCarthy	Stadium: Cardiff City Stadium; Attendance: 25,652; Referee: Howard Webb
	Penalties
	Miller (penalty missed); Conway (penalty scored); Gestede (penalty scored); Whittingham (penalty scored)		(penalty missed) Easter; (penalty missed) Scannell; (penalty scored) Jedinak; (penalty missed) Parr

26 February Final	Cardiff City	2–2 (a.e.t.) (2–3 p)	Liverpool	London
16:00 GMT	Mason 19'; Turner 118'	Report	60' Škrtel; 108' Kuyt	Stadium: Wembley Stadium; Attendance: 89,044; Referee: Mark Clattenburg
	Penalties
	Miller (penalty missed); Cowie (penalty scored); Gestede (penalty missed); Whittingham (penalty scored); Gerrard (penalty missed)		(penalty missed) Gerrard; (penalty missed) Adam; (penalty scored) Kuyt; (penalty scored) Downing; (penalty scored) Johnson

== Overall summary ==
=== Summary ===
Games played	57 (46 Championship, 1 FA Cup, 8 League Cup, 2 Play-offs)
Games won	24 (19 Championship, 0 FA Cup, 5 League Cup, 0 Play-offs)
Games drawn	20 (18 Championship, 0 FA Cup, 2 League Cup, 0 Play-offs)
Games lost	13 (9 Championship, 1 FA Cup, 1 League Cup, 2 Play-offs)
Goals scored	84 (66 Championship, 2 FA Cup, 16 League Cup, 0 Play-offs)
Goals conceded	70 (53 Championship, 4 FA Cup, 9 League Cup, 4 Play-offs)
Goal difference	+14
Clean sheets	18 (15 Championship, 0 FA Cup, 3 League Cup, 0 Play-offs)
Yellow cards	76 (58 Championship, 1 FA Cup, 15 League Cup, 0 Play-offs)
Red cards	0 (0 Championship, 0 FA Cup, 0 League Cup, 0 Play-offs)
Worst discipline	Mark Hudson (8 yellows, 0 red)
Best result	3–0 vs Derby County (A)
Worst result	0–3 vs Hull City (H) & Ipswich Town (A)
Most appearances	Peter Whittingham (55)
Top scorer	Peter Whittingham (13 goals)
Points	75

=== Score overview ===
Opposition	Home score	Away score	Double
Barnsley	5–3	1–0	Yes
Birmingham City	1–0	1–1	No
Blackpool	1–3	1–1	No
Brighton & Hove Albion	1–3	2–2	No
Bristol City	3–1	2–1	Yes
Burnley	0–0	1–1	No
Coventry City	2–2	1–1	No
Crystal Palace	2–0	2–1	Yes
Derby County	1–0	3–0	Yes
Doncaster Rovers	2–0	0–0	No
Hull City	0–3	1–2	No
Ipswich Town	2–2	0–3	No
Leeds United	1–1	1–1	No
Leicester City	0–0	1–2	No
Middlesbrough	2–3	2–1	No
Millwall	0–0	0–0	No
Nottingham Forest	1–0	1–0	Yes
Peterborough United	3–1	3–4	No
Portsmouth	3–2	1–1	No
Reading	3–1	2–1	Yes
Southampton	2–1	1–1	No
Watford	1–1	1–1	No
West Ham United	0–2	1–0	No

== Honours ==
Club

- Football League Cup Runners up

Individual

- Football League Championship Manager of the Month:
  - November – Malky Mackay

Football League Awards

- Football League Player of the Year: Peter Whittingham (nominated)
- Football League Goal of the Year: Peter Whittingham's goal vs Barnsley, 13 March 2011

=== End-of-season awards ===
Player of the Year	Peter Whittingham
Young Player of the Year	Joe Mason
Clubman of the Year	Stephen McPhail
Goal of the Season	Mark Hudson vs Derby County, 17 Apr
Moment of the Year	Ben Turner's goal vs Liverpool, 26 Feb

Source: South Wales Echo

Team of the Week
Date	Player(s)
13/14 August	Mark Hudson
27/28 August	Peter Whittingham
10/11 September	Anthony Gerrard
17 September	Don Cowie
22/23 October	Aron Gunnarsson
5 November	Andrew Taylor
19/20 November	Peter Whittingham
25/26 November	Andrew Taylor
3/4 December	Kevin McNaughton
10 December	David Marshall
2/3 January	Aron Gunnarsson
21 January	Craig Conway, Kenny Miller
