= Cardiff City F.C. Under-23s and Academy =

Youth football academy at Welsh side Cardiff City

Coordinates: 51.471°N 3.2006°W

Cardiff City
- Full name: Cardiff City
- Nickname: The Bluebirds
- Founded: 2004
- Chairman: Mehmet Dalman
- Manager: Darren Purse
- League: Professional Development League 2
Home colours	Away colours	Third colours

The Cardiff City F.C. Academy is the youth football academy at Welsh side Cardiff City. The category two academy has a range of players from ages 7 to 18. The Cardiff City Under-23 side is the highest age group of football other than the senior first team at the club, although the side is allowed to field up to three overage players and a goalkeeper. The age range was initially set at under-21 until 2016 when the limit was increased to players under 23 years of age. From the summer of 2022, the team once again became an Under-21 team. The side competes in the Professional Development League 2.

The youth system at the club was given academy status in 2004 following the investment of chairman Sam Hammam. The academy had several managers in its formative years, including John Kerr who died suddenly while employed in the position. Several players who progressed through the academy in the first five years went on to play for the senior side and represent Wales at international level, such as Joe Ledley, Darcy Blake, Chris Gunter and Aaron Ramsey. Former Cardiff player Neal Ardley spent five years in charge of the academy before departing in 2012, witnessing the construction of the House of Sport training complex.

Dick Bate spent two years as the academy manager between 2012 and 2014 before being replaced by James McCarthy. The academy attracted national attention in 2019 when player development manager Craig Bellamy and other staff members were accused of bullying players. Bellamy stepped down from the role and a later enquiry stated that the environment at the academy had been "unacceptable". In 2020, the club announced plans to upgrade the academy to category one status, the highest possible rating available, and appointed Steve Morison as manager of the under-23 side.

== History ==
=== Background ===
In the post-war era, Cardiff City had developed players using local feeder clubs in a network established under the management of Cyril Spiers. With competitive football suspended during wartime, Spiers had focused his efforts on attracting the best local young players. Spiers resigned from the club before the end of the war over a dispute with the board but his work reaped rewards for his replacement Billy McCandless. He led the club to the Football League Third Division South title with several of Spiers' former youth players in the side.

In the early 1990s, Cardiff's youth system introduced a number of players into the senior squad. The most prominent of these, such as Nathan Blake, Damon Searle and Jason Perry, were known in the media as "the darling buds of Eddie May" in reference to the club's manager.

By the late 1990s, Cardiff chairman Steve Borley led an investment in the club's youth system along with manager Frank Burrows. The move was in direct response to several Cardiff-born players, including future Welsh internationals Craig Bellamy, Mark Pembridge, Gareth Bale and David Cotterill, leaving the area to sign for more sophisticated youth programmes. Neal Ardley, who managed the academy for five years, later stated that during this period, the youth system at Cardiff was an "unattractive prospect" and that staff at the club had described how "we could not have attracted those players at that point because the club had nothing to offer."

=== Academy status ===
==== Early progress ====
Chairman Sam Hammam announced plans for the club to be granted academy status within two years in 2003. This coincided with the youth team using the improved training facilities at the Vale of Glamorgan Hotel and the announcement of a new sponsorship deal for the academy with Brace's Bakery. The club's youth system, ranging from 7- to 18-year-olds, was granted academy status in 2004, with the first match under the new designation being an under-18s fixture against Everton in August of that year. Hammam projected an annual cost of £1 million to run the academy. Hammam invested in the academy as part of his business plan to improve the long-term development of the club's infrastructure, hoping to produce Welsh players for the club's first team. The academy was initially managed by Matthew Crocker before he left the role and was replaced by coach and former professional John Kerr. He remained in the role before his death in 2006 while on holiday in France.

In its formative years under Kerr, the academy enjoyed some success with five players making their professional debuts for the first team within the first two years. Although four, Joe Ledley, Darcy Blake, Curtis McDonald and Joe Jacobson, had all been with the club prior to the academy's founding and one, Cameron Jerome, had been released by another team before signing for Cardiff. Lee Robinson was appointed as Kerr's replacement in June 2006. During the 2006–07 season, two further graduates of the academy, Chris Gunter and Aaron Ramsey, both made their professional debuts. In making his debut, Ramsey became the youngest player in the club's history to feature for the senior side at 16 years and 124 days. Robinson was credited as being a key figure in Ramsey's decision to reject interest from other clubs by local media, but left Cardiff suddenly in 2007 with the club refusing to elaborate on the decision.

Former Cardiff player Neal Ardley was appointed as academy manager in September 2007 shortly after his retirement from playing. One of Ardley's early initiatives was the scouting of local parks teams, with a side being organised to take on Cardiff's academy players. The match resulted in several local players being signed to the academy, including Ibrahim Farah. By this time, Cardiff's academy was also operating five development centres around South Wales, including Brecon, Newport, Neath and the South Wales valleys.

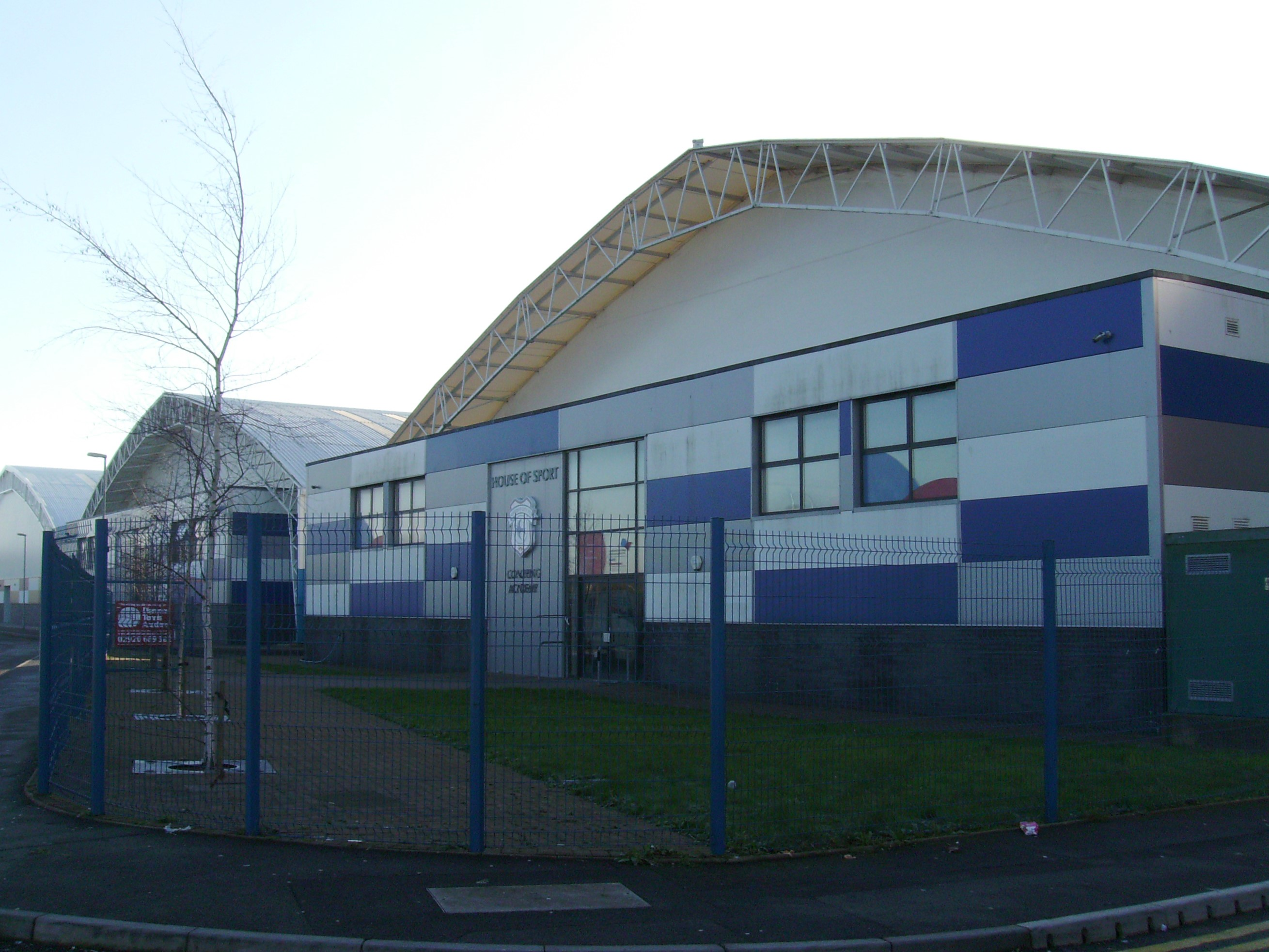
Cardiff City House of Sport

In 2010, the academy moved into the newly built Cardiff City House of Sport (HOS), an indoor football centre and multi-sport venue. The sports facilities are also used by the wider local community in Cardiff. The first phase of the building was opened in November 2010 and it was expended in the second phase (House of Sport 2) in April 2013. The third phase of the building (House of Sport 3) was opened on 18 January 2016.

==== Further development ====
In 2011, a new age group team was launched as the Cardiff City under-21 side to compete in a newly formed development league following a restructure of reserve and youth team football in the English football league system. Former Cardiff player Kevin Cooper was appointed as the team's manager. Malky Mackay was appointed as manager of Cardiff's first team in 2011 and stated his hope of the club's youth system providing more players for the first team. In his first season, Mackay gave debuts to Joe Ralls and Theo Wharton and also gave debuts to several academy players in the following years, including Declan John and Ben Nugent. The club's takeover by Malaysian businessman Vincent Tan also led to the opening of an academy in Kuala Lumpur.

At the start of the 2012–13 season, a new academy tier system was introduced in English football with clubs judged on the quality of facilities and the support they provide. Cardiff applied for the highest category but were eventually designated a category two academy. Academy manager Ardley, who had applied for the senior team managers position along with Mackay, left the club in October 2012 after being appointed manager of League Two side AFC Wimbledon.

Dick Bate, who had previously worked as the elite coaching director for the Football Association, was named as Ardley's replacement in November 2012. He remained in the role until June 2014 when the club underwent a major staff reshuffle which included Bate and Kevin Cooper leaving their roles within the academy. Academy coach James McCarthy was appointed as the new manager of the academy following Bate's departure.

In 2016, the regulations involving tier academies were criticised when Rabbi Matondo left Cardiff's academy to sign for Manchester City. Under the regulations, teams with tier one academies, such as Manchester City, can freely sign players from lower ranked academies. Cardiff received compensation, believed to be around £500,000, for Matondo who was sold by Manchester City to FC Schalke 04 for around £10 million without appearing for the senior side. The same year, the Premier League raised the age limit of the Premier Development League sides to under-23s.

==== Restructuring ====
Following the arrival of Neil Warnock as first team manager in 2018, the youth system at Cardiff underwent a significant overhaul. This included the departure of several coaches and the arrival of former players Craig Bellamy and Andy Legg. Warnock criticised the under-23 squad, stating "and I don't think it's giving the younger players, the 18-year-olds, the right opportunities". Bellamy was appointed as a player development manager, assisting all of the academies age groups. The club's under-18 side went on to win the Premier Development League Division Two South in the 2018–19 season. However, less than a year into the role, Bellamy stood down after an accusation of bullying from the parents of a former academy player which he denied. No charges were brought against Bellamy but an independent investigation commissioned by the club described that there had been an "unacceptable coaching environment" within the academy for which Bellamy later apologised and stated "The allegations [...] made against me were difficult for me to come to terms with as I deplore bullying and any form of discrimination." Following his departure, Bellamy criticised Warnock over his reluctance in promoting academy players to the senior side, although Warnock responded by stating his belief that there were no players of sufficient quality within the youth system at the time.

Warnock left the club in 2019 and was replaced by Neil Harris. Soon after, the club announced plans to upgrade the academy to a category one facility in the hope of increasing the number of players impacting on the senior side. One of Harris' first appointments at the club was the hiring of his former player Steve Morison as the new manager of the under-23 squad.

== Graduates ==
=== At Cardiff City ===
Since the youth system at the club was granted academy status in June 2004, several players have gone on to feature for the first team. The following current or former players have made at least one senior appearance for the club after having been part of the youth academy.

(England) Cameron Antwi
(Wales) Noah Anyadike
(Wales) Cian Ashford
(Republic of Ireland) Joel Bagan
(Wales) **Darcy Blake**
(Wales) Sam Bowen
(Wales) Jonathan Brown
(Wales) **Joel Colwill**
(Wales) **Rubin Colwill**
(England) Raheem Conte
(Wales) Cameron Coxe
(Wales) **Isaak Davies**
(Wales) Tom Davies
(Wales) Oliver Denham

(Wales) Axel Donczew
(Wales) Alex Evans
(Wales) Kieron Evans
(Wales) Ibrahim Farah
(Wales) Luey Giles
(Wales) **Chris Gunter**
(Wales) **Mark Harris**
(Wales) Joe Jacobson
(Wales) Tom James
(Antigua and Barbuda) **Nathaniel Jarvis**
(Wales) **Declan John**
(Wales) Eli King
(Wales) **Ronan Kpakio**

(Wales) **Dylan Lawlor**
(Wales) **Joe Ledley**
(Wales) Dakarai Mafico
(Northern Ireland) **Josh Magennis**
(Wales) **Adam Matthews**
(Wales) Curtis McDonald
(Wales) Aaron Morris
(England) Ben Nugent
(Wales) Tanatswa Nyakuhwa
(England) Deji Oshilaja
(Wales) Tommy O'Sullivan
(Wales) Daniel Parslow

(Republic of Ireland) Luke Pearce
(England) Joe Ralls
(Wales) **Aaron Ramsey**
(England) Michael Reindorf
(France) Kevin Sainte-Luce
(England) Tom Sang
(Ghana) Jai Semenyo
(Wales) Rob Tankiewicz
(Saint Kitts and Nevis) **Theo Wharton**
(Wales) James Waite
(England) Aaron Wildig
(England) Chanka Zimba

=== At other clubs ===
The following players have gone on to play senior professional football after having left or been released by the academy.

(Wales) Ash Baker
(Wales) **Wes Burns**
(Wales) Aaron Amadi-Holloway
(Wales) **Charlie Crew**
(Wales) James Crole
(Wales) Andrew Hughes
(Wales) **Tom Lockyer**

(Wales) **Rabbi Matondo**
(Wales) Jonathan Meades
(Wales) Rollin Menayese
(Wales) Keenan Patten
(Wales) **Regan Poole**
(Wales) Dave Richards
(Canada) Jordan Santiago

(Wales) Macauley Southam-Hales
(Wales) Siôn Spence
(Wales) Ben Swallow
(Democratic Republic of the Congo) David Tutonda
(Wales) Josh Yorwerth

Those in bold have been capped at full international level.

== Personnel ==
As of 4 August 2026

- Head of Academy
  - Gavin Chesterfield
- Academy operations manager
  - Gavin Reen
- Under 21s Lead Coach
  - Vacant
- Under 18s Lead Coach
  - Vacant
- Head of Coaching
  - Dane Facey
- Lead Youth Development Coach
  - Ben Adams
- Lead foundation coach
  - Lawrence Hallett
- Head of Education
  - Olivia Linton
- Head of Goalkeeping
  - Lee Kendall

== Under-21 squad ==
The Under-21 development team compete in the Professional Development League 2. Players with squad numbers have appeared in or are part of the senior squad but regularly return to play for the under-21 team.

As of 1 September 2026

Note: Flags indicate national team as defined under FIFA eligibility rules; some limited exceptions apply. Players may hold more than one non-FIFA nationality.

No.	Pos.	Nation	Player
—	GK	WAL	Jake Dennis
—	GK	WAL	Ewan Griffiths
—	DF	WAL	Thierry Katsukunya
—	DF	ENG	Gabriel Keita
—	DF	IRL	Charlie O'Brien
—	DF	WAL	T-Jay Parfitt
—	DF	WAL	Jac Thomas
—	DF	WAL	Noah Williams
—	MF	WAL	Hayden Allmark

No.	Pos.	Nation	Player
—	MF	WAL	Isaac Davies
40	MF	WAL	Jake Davies
28	MF	WAL	Dakarai Mafico
50	MF	ENG	Charlie Holt
52	MF	WAL	Troy Perrett
—	FW	WAL	Mannie Barton
—	FW	ENG	Riley Hilaire-Clarke
—	FW	ENG	Herbie James
—	FW	GUI	Sekou Kaba
—	FW	WAL	Daniel Ola

=== Out on Loan ===
Note: Flags indicate national team as defined under FIFA eligibility rules; some limited exceptions apply. Players may hold more than one non-FIFA nationality.

No.	Pos.	Nation	Player
—	GK	WAL	Danny Higgs (on loan at Penybont)
—	GK	WAL	Luke Armstrong (on loan at Raith Rovers)
—	MF	WAL	Trey George (on loan at Sligo Rovers)
—	MF	WAL	Cody Twose (on loan at Haverfordwest County)
—	FW	WAL	Tanatswa Nyakuhwa (on loan at Newport County)
—	DF	WAL	Alyas Debono (on loan at Penybont)
46	DF	WAL	Luey Giles (on loan at Kidderminster Harriers)
—	DF	ENG	Caden Voice (on loan at Weston Super Mare)

== Under 18s ==
The under-18s team play in Division 2 South of the Professional Development League.

As of 13 August 2026

Note: Flags indicate national team as defined under FIFA eligibility rules; some limited exceptions apply. Players may hold more than one non-FIFA nationality.

No.	Pos.	Nation	Player
33	MF	WAL	Rob Tankiewicz
40	DF	WAL	Noah Anyadike
43	MF	WAL	Paul Moreno
—	GK	WAL	Joshua Donovan
—	GK	WAL	Alex Cross
—	GK	WAL	Charlie Bell
—	DF	WAL	Logan Cartwright
—	DF	ENG	Zechariah Larbi
—	DF	WAL	Keano Conaty
—	DF	WAL	Harri Davies
—	DF	WAL	Thomas Prickett

No.	Pos.	Nation	Player
—	MF	WAL	Tiger Tobin
—	MF	WAL	Ellis Yorke
—	MF	WAL	Josh Itsindo
—	MF	WAL	Jacob Norris
—	MF	ENG	Cass Machin
—	MF	POR	Pedro Araujo
—	FW	WAL	Leo Papirnyk
—	FW	WAL	Jack Sykes
—	FW	WAL	Taona Nyakuwha
