= Elliot Parish =

English footballer

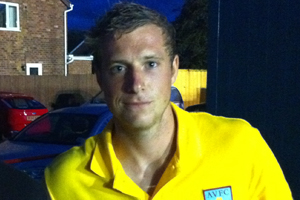
- Elliot Parish with Aston Villa in August 2011

Personal information
- Full name: Elliot Charles Parish
- Date of birth: 20 May 1990 (age 36)
- Place of birth: Towcester, England
- Height: 1.88 m (6 ft 2 in)
- Position: Goalkeeper

Team information
- Current team: Atlanta United (goalkeeper coach)

Youth career
- 2006–2009: Aston Villa

Senior career*
Years	Team	Apps	(Gls)
2009–2012	Aston Villa	0	(0)
2011	→ Lincoln City (loan)	9	(0)
2011	→ Cardiff City (loan)	0	(0)
2012–2013	Cardiff City	0	(0)
2012	→ Wycombe Wanderers (loan)	2	(0)
2013–2014	Bristol City	19	(0)
2014	→ Newport County (loan)	7	(0)
2014–2015	Blackpool	13	(0)
2015–2016	Colchester United	25	(0)
2016–2017	Accrington Stanley	11	(0)
2017–2019	Dundee	30	(0)
2019–2023	St Johnstone	18	(0)
Total		134	(0)

International career
2009	England U20	3	(0)

Managerial career
- 2022–2023: St Johnstone (GK coach)
- 2025–: Atlanta United (GK coach)
- * Club domestic league appearances and goals

Elliot Charles Parish (born 20 May 1990) is an English professional football coach and a former goalkeeper. He is the goalkeeper coach of Major League Soccer club Atlanta United.

Parish began his career at Aston Villa, where he progressed through the club's Academy. He made his professional debut away from the club on loan at League Two side Lincoln City in 2011, before a short loan at Cardiff City where he made no appearances. He joined Cardiff on a permanent basis in January 2012, before being loaned out to Wycombe Wanderers later the same year. He was released by the club in 2013, again failing to make a first-team appearance. He joined Bristol City, where he went on to make 19 league appearances, but again found himself out on loan, on this occasion to Newport County. He later joined Blackpool for one season, and then played for Colchester United for one season, before joining Accrington Stanley. He then signed for Dundee where he spent two seasons. Internationally, Parish has represented England at under-20 level.

Parish finished his playing career with St Johnstone, and began his coaching career there as the club's goalkeeper coach. In 2025, Parish became Major League Soccer club Atlanta United under manager Ronny Deila.

== Club career ==
=== Aston Villa ===
Born in Towcester, Parish joined the Academy at Aston Villa ahead of the 2006–07 season. He became the regular goalkeeper for Villa's under-18 side that won the 2007–08 Premier Academy League title and reached the semi-final of the FA Youth Cup the same year. While with the club, he represented the England under-20 team, playing in the 2009 FIFA U-20 World Cup. England manager Brian Eastick said that Parish was one of the best players at the tournament. Having travelled with the first-team squad during pre-season and in the Europa League, Parish became the regular goalkeeper for Aston Villa's reserve team during the 2010–11 season.

==== Lincoln City loan ====
League Two side Lincoln City signed Parish on 24 March 2011 on loan until the end of the season. He went straight into Lincoln's starting eleven to make his professional debut the following day, conceding six goals as Rotherham United won 6–0 at Sincil Bank. Parish made nine appearances for Lincoln, conceding 23 goals in a period where the Imps accrued just one point.

=== Cardiff City ===
Cardiff City initially signed Parish on a six-week loan from Aston Villa on 23 September 2011. However, despite failing to make an appearance for Cardiff, manager Malky Mackay signed Parish on a permanent basis on 4 January 2012, with the player signing a one-and-a-half-year deal. At the end of the 2012–13 season, Parish was released after the club decided not to offer him a new deal.

==== Wycombe Wanderers loan ====
Parish joined Wycombe Wanderers in an emergency loan deal on 18 September 2012 after injuries to regular goalkeepers Nikki Bull and Matt Ingram. He made his debut for the club the same day in a 3–2 defeat away to Exeter City. He made just one further appearance for the club, a 1–0 home defeat by AFC Wimbledon four days later.

=== Bristol City ===
After his release by Cardiff, Parish joined Scottish Premiership side Aberdeen on trial with a view to a permanent contract. However, after one week training with Aberdeen, it was announced that Parish would not be offered a deal by the club. He then joined League One club Bristol City on trial on 11 July 2013. On 26 July, it was announced that Parish had signed a two-year deal with the club following his successful trial.

Parish made his debut for Bristol City on 27 August in a 2–1 League Cup win over Premier League club Crystal Palace. After making 19 league outings and becoming a regular starter, Parish found himself out of favour following the loan arrival of Simon Moore from Cardiff.

==== Newport County loan ====
Parish joined League Two side Newport County in an emergency loan deal on 10 February 2014, making his debut on 15 February in a 3–0 defeat at Hartlepool United. After the clubs had initially agreed to extend Parish's loan spell, Newport decided to not exercise an extension and Parish returned to his parent club on 10 March after making seven appearances.

=== Blackpool ===
On 7 August 2014, Championship side Blackpool signed Parish on a free transfer from Bristol City. He became the club's twelfth summer signing, joining on a one-year deal with the option of a further 12-months. He made his debut on 3 October, keeping a clean sheet in a 1–0 win over his former club Cardiff, Blackpool's first win of the season. After Blackpool were relegated from the Championship at the end of the season, Parish was released after making only 13 appearances all season.

=== Colchester United ===
Parish joined League One side Colchester United on trial in July 2015 in a bid to gain fitness and earn a contract. He joined the club following an injury to first-choice goalkeeper Sam Walker that ruled him out of the early stages of pre-season. After playing in all four of Colchester's pre-season friendlies, including 90-minutes during a 1–0 win against West Ham United, Parish signed a one-year deal with the club on 23 July. He made his debut on the opening day of the season against his former club Blackpool, conceding two goals as Colchester were held to a 2–2 draw at the Colchester Community Stadium.

In Walker's absence, Parish established himself as Colchester's first-choice goalkeeper in the latter stages of the season as he went on to make 28 appearances for the club. However, at the end of the campaign, it was announced that Parish had not been offered a new contract by Colchester.

=== Accrington Stanley ===
After leaving Colchester, Parish signed for League Two rivals Accrington Stanley on a one-year contract in June 2016.

=== Dundee ===
Parish signed a one-year contract with Scottish Premiership club Dundee in July 2017. He made his debut on 4 November 2017, in a 2–1 defeat away to Hibernian. On 6 May 2018, Parish signed a new contract, keeping him at Dens Park for another year. He left the club at the end of his contract.

=== St Johnstone ===
On 20 June 2019, Parish signed for St Johnstone on a two-year contract. Parish would win both the Scottish Cup and Scottish League Cup with the Saintees, and later moved into the role of first-team goalkeeping coach before departing the club in 2023.

== Coaching career ==
=== Atlanta United ===
On 10 January 2025, Parish was announced as the new goalkeeping coach of Major League Soccer club Atlanta United under new manager Ronny Deila.

== International career ==
Parish represented England at under-20 level. He made his debut during the 2009 FIFA U-20 World Cup in Egypt, playing in each group stage match for England as they crashed out of the competition without a win in three games. Despite their failure to progress, Parish impressed coach Brian Eastick with his performances, with Eastick saying that Parish had "come in and acquitted himself really well in the three games he's played".

== Career statistics ==
Appearances and goals by club, season and competition
Club	Season	League			National Cup		League Cup		Other		Total	
Club	Season	Division	Apps	Goals	Apps	Goals	Apps	Goals	Apps	Goals	Apps	Goals
Aston Villa	2008–09	Premier League	0	0	0	0	0	0	—		0	0
Aston Villa	2009–10	Premier League	0	0	0	0	0	0	—		0	0
Aston Villa	2010–11	Premier League	0	0	0	0	0	0	—		0	0
Aston Villa	2011–12	Premier League	0	0	0	0	0	0	—		0	0
Aston Villa	Total		0	0	0	0	0	0	0	0	0	0
Lincoln City (loan)	2010–11	League Two	9	0	0	0	0	0	0	0	9	0
Cardiff City (loan)	2011–12	Championship	0	0	0	0	0	0	—		0	0
Cardiff City	2011–12	Championship	0	0	0	0	0	0	—		0	0
Cardiff City	2012–13	Championship	0	0	0	0	0	0	—		0	0
Cardiff City	Total		0	0	0	0	0	0	0	0	0	0
Wycombe Wanderers (loan)	2012–13	League Two	2	0	0	0	0	0	0	0	2	0
Bristol City	2013–14	League One	19	0	4	0	2	0	1 (Note: Appearance in Football League Trophy)	0	26	0
Newport County (loan)	2013–14	League Two	7	0	0	0	0	0	0	0	7	0
Blackpool	2014–15	Championship	13	0	0	0	0	0	—		13	0
Colchester United	2015–16	League One	25	0	1	0	1	0	1	0	28	0
Accrington Stanley	2016–17	League Two	11	0	1	0	3	0	1	0	16	0
Dundee	2017–18	Scottish Premiership	25	0	3	0	0	0	—		28	0
Dundee	2018–19	Scottish Premiership	5	0	0	0	2	0	—		7	0
Dundee	Total		30	0	3	0	2	0	0	0	35	0
St Johnstone	2019–20	Scottish Premiership	0	0	0	0	2	0	—		2	0
St Johnstone	2020–21	Scottish Premiership	9	0	1	0	1	0	—		11	0
St Johnstone	2021–22	Scottish Premiership	7	0	0	0	1	0	0	0	8	0
St Johnstone	2022–23	Scottish Premiership	2	0	0	0	4	0	0	0	6	0
St Johnstone	Total		18	0	1	0	8	0	0	0	27	0
Career total			134	0	10	0	16	0	3	0	163	0

== Honours ==
Aston Villa U18

- Premier Academy League: 2007–08

St Johnstone

- Scottish Cup: 2020–21
- Scottish League Cup: 2020–21
