= Noah Anyadike =

Welsh footballer (born 2011)

Personal information
- Full name: Noah Dafydd Anyadike
- Date of birth: 19 May 2011 (age 15)
- Position: Defender

Team information
- Current team: Cardiff City
- Number: 40

Youth career
- 2025–: Cardiff City

Senior career*
Years	Team	Apps	(Gls)
2026–	Cardiff City	0	(0)

International career^{‡}
2025–2026	Wales U15	7	(0)
2025–	Wales U16	2	(0)
2026–	Wales U21	1	(0)
- * Club domestic league appearances and goals as of 1 November 2026 (UTC) ‡ National team caps and goals as of 8 October 2026

Noah Dafydd Anyadike (born 19 May 2011) is a Welsh footballer who plays as a defender for EFL Championship club Cardiff City and the Wales national under-21 football team.

== Club career ==
Anyadike was called up to train with the Cardiff City senior team when he was 14.

Due to an injury crisis in the team, on 25 August 2026 Anyadike was called up to make his senior professional debut, playing as central defender in the second round of the EFL Cup against Norwich City. At 15 years 98 days old, he became the youngest ever player in the history of the EFL Cup and the youngest ever player for Cardiff City. Unfortunately he was substituted in the second half of the match, suffering from cramp. Cardiff manager, Brian Barry-Murphy, said afterwards "We've been lucky because he's still in school, so he spent so much time with us in the school holidays. He's making exceptional strides. We were very clear he was the best option for this game based on how well he's done."

== International career ==
Born in Carmarthenshire, Anyadike is of Nigerian descent. He was called up to be part of the Wales Under-16 squad to play in the Cwpan Gary Speed tournament in north Wales between 26 and 31 August 2025. He started in all three matches, though was substituted in the first match against Japan, in the 85th minute.

In September 2026 Anyadike was called up to be part of the Wales under-21 squad.

== Personal life ==
Anyadike is from Pen-y-groes, Carmarthenshire. An exceptionally fast sprinter, he became Carmarthen Schools' 200-metre champion.
