= Jai Semenyo =

English footballer (born 2003)

Personal information
- Full name: Jai Erlom Semenyo
- Date of birth: 13 July 2003 (age 23)
- Place of birth: England
- Position: Full-back

Youth career
- –2021: Mangotsfield United
- 2021–2024: Cardiff City

Senior career*
Years	Team	Apps	(Gls)
2024–2025	Eastleigh	24	(1)
2025–	Lorient B	2	(0)
- * Club domestic league appearances and goals as of 23:25, 16 May 2026 (GMT+7)

Jai Erlom Semenyo (born 13 July 2003) is an English footballer who plays as a full-back for Championnat National 1 club Lorient B.

== Career ==
On 6 February 2022, Semenyo debuted for Cardiff City in a 3–1 defeat to Liverpool in the FA Cup. On 9 August 2022, debuted at Cardiff City Stadium for Cardiff City in the EFL Cup 3–0 defeat to Portsmouth as a second-half substitute. On 7 June 2024, Cardiff said the player would be leaving the club and the end of June. On 7 August 2024, Semenyo joined National League side Eastleigh following a successful trial period. He departed the club upon the expiration of his contract at the end of the 2024–25 season.

In November 2025 he signed for French club FC Lorient B.

== Personal life ==
Jai is the younger brother of Ghana international footballer Antoine Semenyo.
