= Joe Mason (footballer, born 1991) =

Association football player (born 1991)

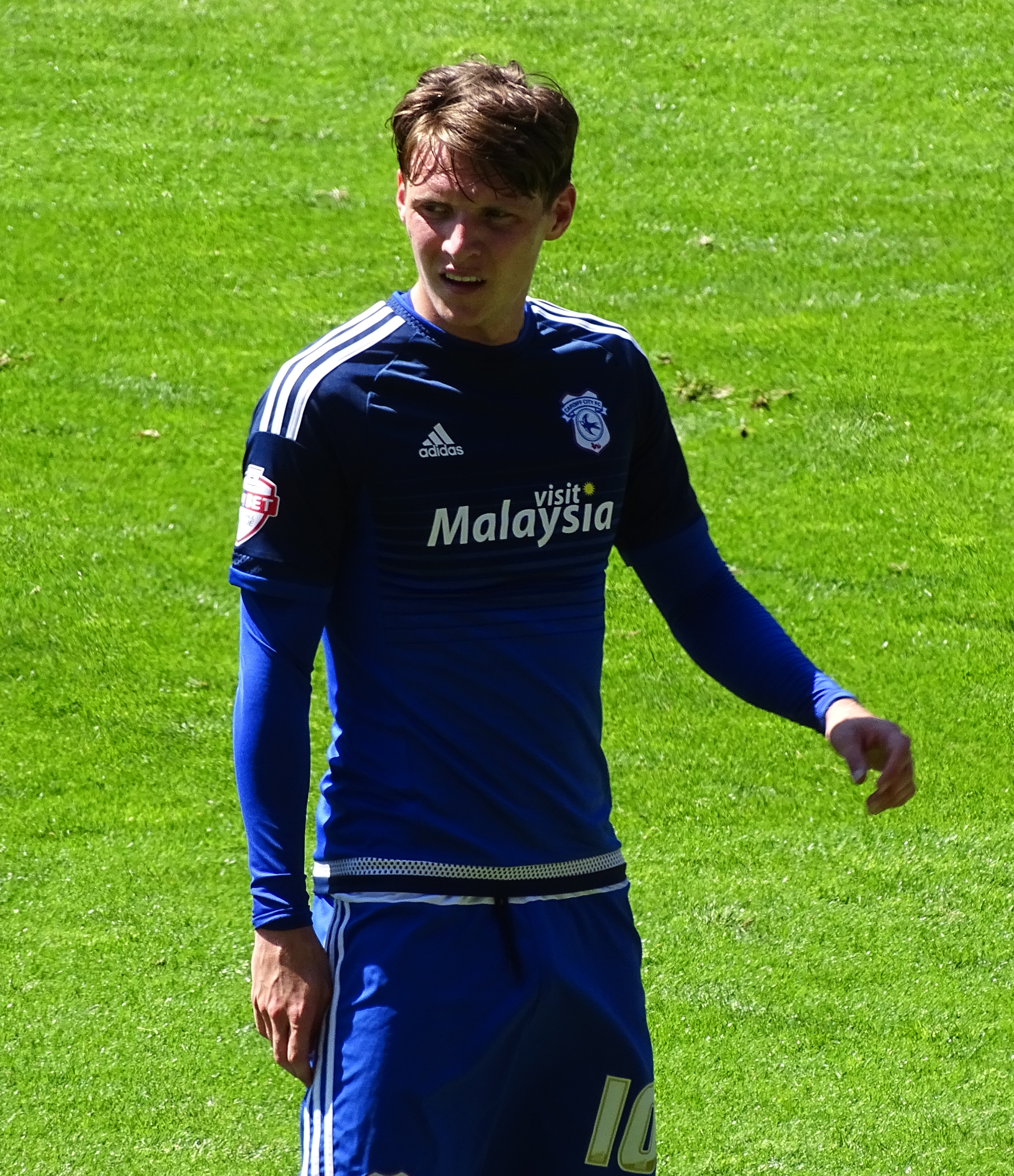
- Mason with Cardiff City in 2015

Personal information
- Full name: Joseph Mason
- Date of birth: 13 May 1991 (age 35)
- Place of birth: Plymouth, England
- Height: 5 ft 10 in (1.78 m)
- Position: Forward

Youth career
- 2000–2009: Plymouth Argyle

Senior career*
Years	Team	Apps	(Gls)
2009–2011	Plymouth Argyle	53	(10)
2011–2016	Cardiff City	98	(22)
2013–2015	→ Bolton Wanderers (loan)	28	(10)
2016–2019	Wolverhampton Wanderers	35	(6)
2017–2018	→ Burton Albion (loan)	6	(1)
2018	→ Colorado Rapids (loan)	14	(3)
2018–2019	→ Portsmouth (loan)	1	(0)
2019–2021	Milton Keynes Dons	37	(8)
2021–2023	Cavalry FC	51	(15)
2026–	Radstock Town	0	(0)

International career
2008	Republic of Ireland U18	3	(1)
2009	Republic of Ireland U19	6	(2)
2010–2011	Republic of Ireland U21	3	(0)
- * Club domestic league appearances and goals as of November 30, 2023

Joseph Mason (born 13 May 1991) is a professional footballer who plays for Radstock Town. Born in England, he was a youth international for the Republic of Ireland.

Mason began his career with Plymouth Argyle, his home town club, for whom he made 53 Football League appearances. While at Cardiff he scored in the 2012 Football League Cup Final and won promotion to the highest level of English football. Mason played youth international football for the Republic of Ireland by virtue of his mother, who was born in County Mayo.

== Club career ==
=== Plymouth Argyle ===
Mason began his career as a youth player with home-town club Plymouth Argyle at the age of 10. He was a regular scorer for the youth team and made the step up to reserve team football with similar ease, playing his part as the club won the Football Combination in 2009, with Mason as the club's top goalscorer. He signed his first professional contract with the club in May 2009, and immediately set about breaking into the club's first team, describing becoming a professional as a very proud moment.

He began the 2009–10 season training with the first-team squad and again featured regularly for the club's reserves. He made his competitive debut, and his first start, for the club against Sheffield United at Home Park on 5 December 2009, playing for 65 minutes before being replaced by Craig Noone to a standing ovation. He signed an extension to his contract with the club in January 2010 until the summer of 2012, with Paul Mariner commenting that the youngster has a very bright future. He scored his first senior goal in the return fixture against Sheffield United at Bramall Lane on 27 February 2010.

=== Cardiff City ===
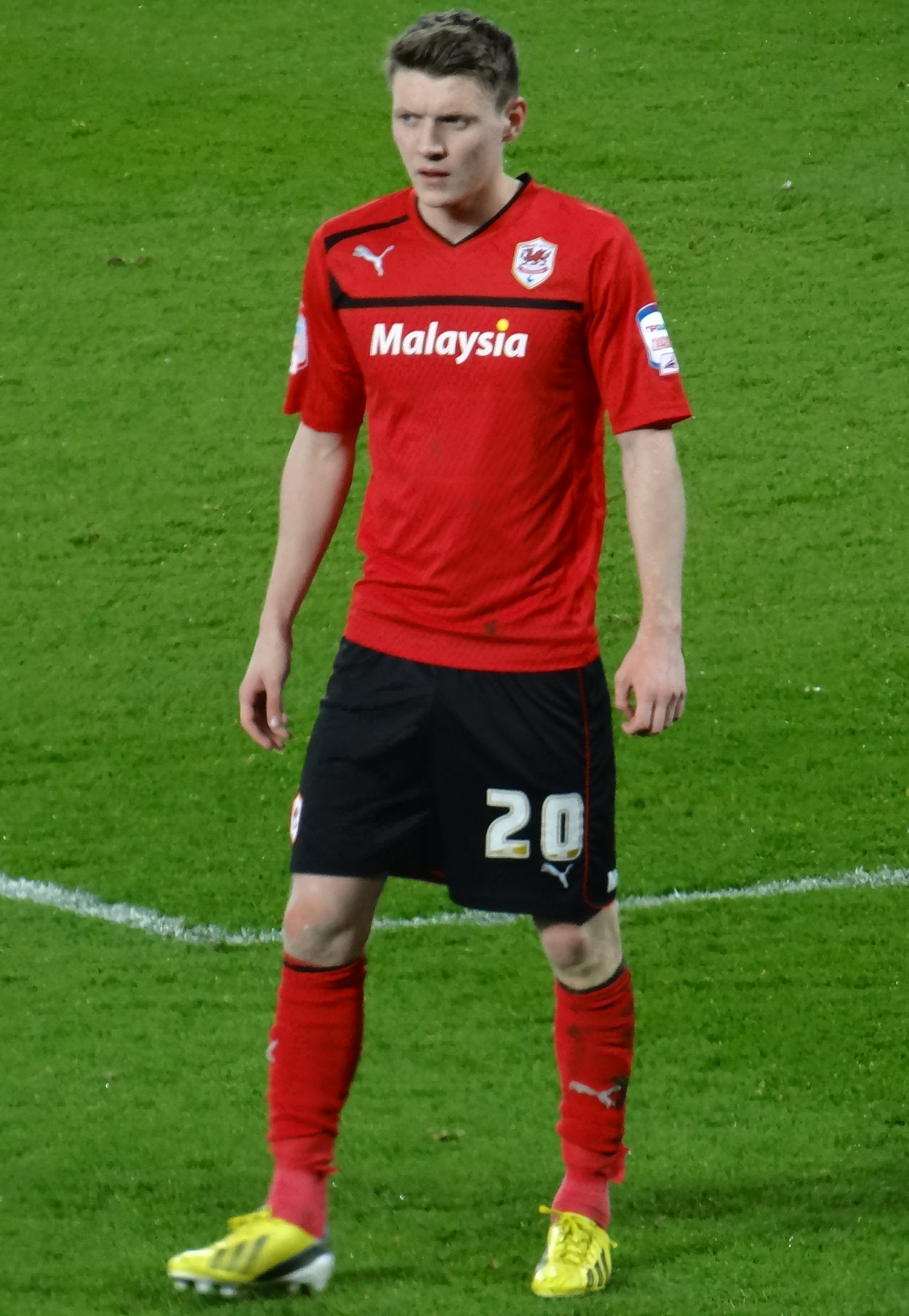
Mason playing for Cardiff City in 2013

On 8 July 2011, Championship side Cardiff City agreed a £250,000 transfer fee for Mason. Two days later the deal was completed and he signed a three-year deal with the Welsh club. Mason made his debut for Cardiff in a 1–0 win at West Ham United on 7 August 2011, replacing Craig Conway as a second-half substitute. He made his first start on 17 August in a home match against Brighton & Hove Albion, which Cardiff lost 3–1. Mason scored his first goal for the club on 22 October, in a 5–3 victory over Barnsley. His next goal came three days later in the League Cup, the goal against Burnley meant that Cardiff reached their first League Cup quarter final since 1965. Mason scored his fifth goal of the campaign in a 3–1 win at home to Reading on 2 January 2012.

Having helped Cardiff reach the final of the League Cup, Mason scored the first goal against Liverpool at Wembley Stadium on 26 February. With the score level after 90 minutes, Mason was substituted for Filip Kiss. Cardiff lost 3–2 on penalties after the game finished two-all. Mason scored his 9th and 10th goals against fellow play-off hopefuls Brighton and Middlesbrough respectively, which put him in the top three goal scorers at Cardiff. On 20 April, Mason signed a new contract to extend his stay in the Welsh capital until the summer of 2016. He celebrated his contract extension with a goal against Leeds United, then later on Mason was awarded the Club Young Player of the Year award. He enjoyed a really impressive first season in the Welsh Capital having scored 12 goals, more than he scored in his previous two put together and Cardiff had reached the play-offs but were however knocked out by West Ham United in the semi-finals.

Mason collected his first goal of the 2012–13 season on 25 August against severnside rivals Bristol City, which was also his 50th appearance in a Cardiff shirt. He scored his second of the season on his third league start against Burnley on 27 October, before scoring one of City's goals in the 5–4 defeat to Charlton Athletic soon after. His fourth came on 7 December, scoring the third in a 4–1 win at Ewood Park against Blackburn Rovers. Mason scored on New Years Day against Birmingham City, which took Cardiff seven points clear at the top of the table. Mason registered his sixth goal of the 2012–13 season after coming on as a substitute against Blackburn Rovers on 1 April 2013, at Cardiff City Stadium.

=== Loans to Bolton ===
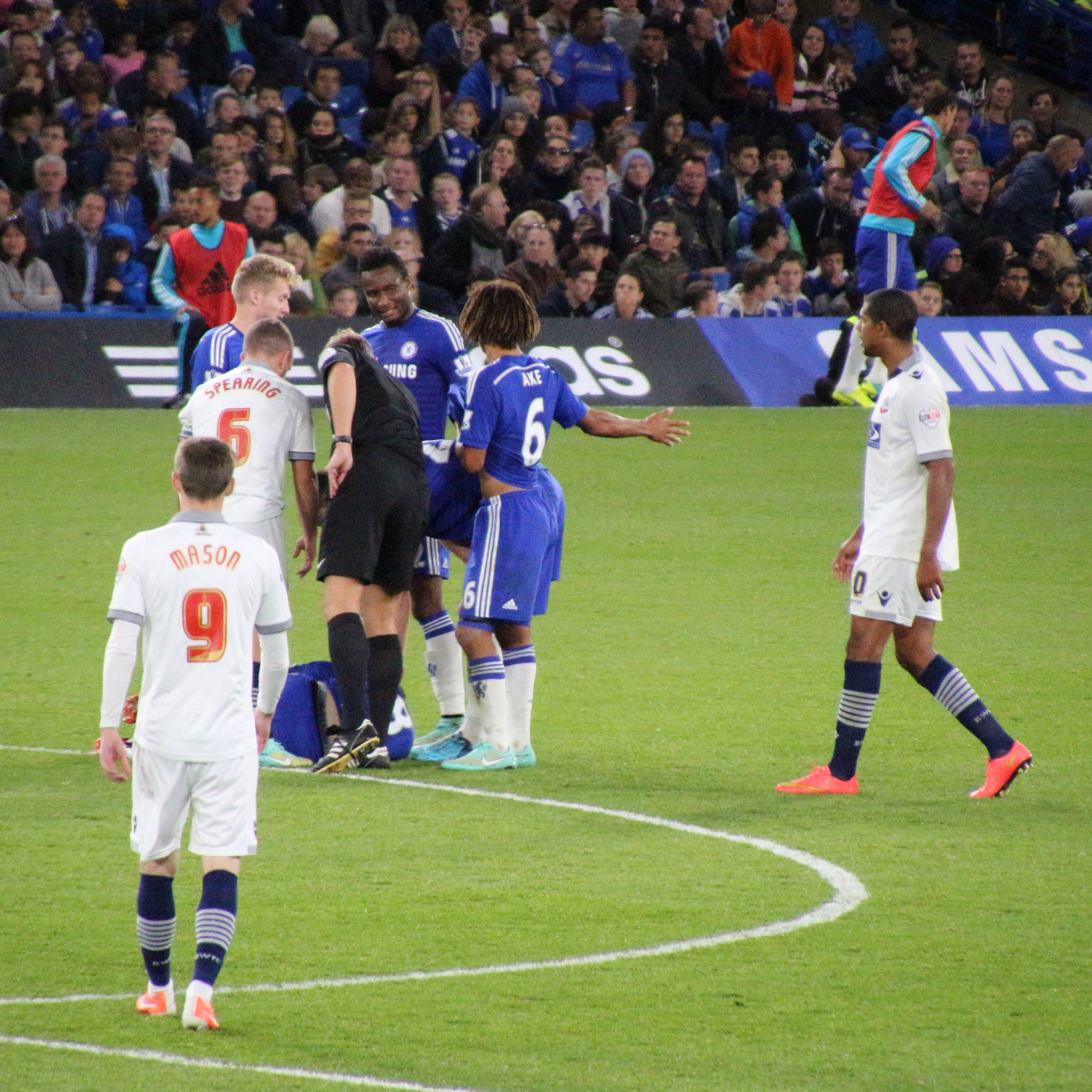
Mason (furthest left) playing for Bolton Wanderers against Chelsea in the League Cup in 2014

On 11 November 2013, a loan deal was agreed with Football League Championship side Bolton Wanderers until 5 January 2014. However, the following day it was announced that Cardiff manager Malky Mackay had a change of heart over the deal and the striker stayed in South Wales, despite having travelled up to Bolton to train with them on the previous day.

A move to Bolton was finally completed on 27 November 2013 once Cardiff's injury situation had cleared up, and this allowed Mason to link up with Wanderers until the New Year on a similar arrangement to that of teammate Kevin McNaughton.

He made his Bolton debut on 30 November 2013 in an away defeat against Middlesbrough at the Riverside Stadium as a substitute for Neil Danns. His first start and goal came a week later as he opened the scoring for Wanderers in a 3–0 win over Doncaster Rovers at the Reebok Stadium.

On 20 February 2014, Mason re-joined Bolton Wanderers on a two-month loan, but returned on 11 August 2014 for a full season-long loan. On 16 September 2014, Mason scored a second half hat-trick to earn Bolton their first win of the season at home to Rotherham United. This was the first hat-trick scored by a Bolton player in a competitive match since Fredi Bobic against Ipswich in 2002. On 21 January 2015 his loan was terminated by mutual agreement.

=== Return to Cardiff ===
Following his return from injury, Mason became a key part in new Cardiff boss, Russell Slade's plans towards the end of the 2014–15 season. The next season, Mason was rewarded the number 10 shirt and started the first 17 games of the season, with a return of 5 goals. During October, Cardiff suffered a barren run of goals scoring only 2, one where Mason scored the opener in a 1–1 with Brighton & Hove Albion. This resulted in Mason being dropped and new signing Tony Watt taking his place.

=== Wolverhampton Wanderers ===
On 28 January 2016, Mason signed a three-and-a-half-year contract with fellow Championship club Wolverhampton Wanderers for an undisclosed fee. He made his debut for Wolverhampton Wanderers on 2 February 2016 against Bolton, in a 2–2 draw at Molineux, in which he scored after three minutes of the game.

The following season saw him score four further goals (including against Midlands rivals Birmingham and Aston Villa), to add to the three for Wolves in the second half of the previous campaign. However, after another new head coach arrived -–the fourth different one at Wolves within his short spell – Mason found himself out of his plans. On 23 August 2017, he was sent on loan to fellow Championship side Burton Albion until January 2018. He scored on his debut for Burton in a 1–1 draw with Sheffield Wednesday on 26 August 2017.

After returning from his spell at Burton, he moved again on loan, this time to Major League Soccer side Colorado Rapids on 20 February 2018 until the end of the 2018 MLS season. On 12 July 2018, it was announced that Mason would end his planned season-long loan early and return to Wolverhampton.

As the 2018–19 season began in England, Mason still remained outside of the first team plans at Wolves, who had by now been promoted to the Premier League. On 31 August 2018, he was loaned out to League One Portsmouth until January in a move which saw him again link up with Kenny Jackett who had signed him at Wolves. However, he made just a single appearance in the league for Pompey, appearing as a late substitute against Wycombe Wanderers. On the final day of the January 2019 transfer window, his contract with Wolves was terminated by mutual agreement to allow Mason to find a new permanent club.

=== Milton Keynes Dons ===
On 4 June 2019, Mason joined newly promoted League One club Milton Keynes Dons. Having suffered another injury setback early in the season, Mason's appearances for the club were limited and at the conclusion of the 2019–20 campaign he was one of nine players released. Mason re-joined the club in August 2020 ahead of the 2020–21 season. On 19 January 2021, Mason scored a 28-minute hat-trick in a 3–1 home win over Fleetwood Town.

=== Cavalry FC ===
On 10 May 2021, Mason signed a multi-year deal with Canadian Premier League side Cavalry FC. He made his debut for Cavalry on 18 July against the HFX Wanderers. In his third game for Cavalry on 3 August, Mason scored his first goal for the club, netting the first goal in a 2–1 comeback victory over Albertan rivals FC Edmonton. In January 2022, it was announced Mason would return for the 2022 season, his second with the club. After two seasons Mason would be the leading goal scorer for the club. In January 2023, Cavalry announced they had exercised Mason's contract option for the 2023 season. Upon completion of the 2023 season, Mason would be out of contract, ending his time with the club. During his final season he helped them win the 2023 CPL Shield.

=== Radstock Town ===
In July 2026, Mason came out of retirement joining Radstock Town in the English tenth tier Western Football League Division One.

== International career ==
Mason was born in Plymouth, but was eligible to represent the Republic of Ireland because his mother was born in County Mayo. He represented the Republic at under-16 and under-18 level before being called up to the under-19 squad for the Four-Nation tournament and their qualifying games in the UEFA Under-19 European Championships. He played in their 2–0 win against Turkey, and their 1–0 defeat to Portugal as the Irish finished second, behind Netherlands. He scored twice for the Republic in their 5–0 win against San Marino, and played a crucial role in their 2–0 win against Albania. The Irish finished second in Group 1, behind Italy, and both qualified for the elite round which took place in May 2010. Mason received his first call-up to the under-21 side in July 2010, and made his debut two months later in a 1–0 defeat to Switzerland.

== Personal life ==
Mason grew up supporting Plymouth Argyle and attended St Boniface's Catholic College. His older brother, Anthony, was an apprentice at the club and signed a professional contract in 2007, but was released without making a first team appearance.

== Career statistics ==
As of 28 October 2023

Appearances and goals by club, season and competition
Club	Season	League			National cup		League cup		Other		Total	
Club	Season	Division	Apps	Goals	Apps	Goals	Apps	Goals	Apps	Goals	Apps	Goals
Plymouth Argyle	2009–10	Championship	19	3	0	0	0	0	—		19	3
Plymouth Argyle	2010–11	League One	34	7	1	0	0	0	1 (Note: Appearance in Football League Trophy)	0	36	7
Plymouth Argyle	Total		53	10	1	0	0	0	1	0	55	10
Cardiff City	2011–12	Championship	39	9	1	1	4	2	2 (Note: Appearances in 2012 Football League play-offs)	0	46	12
Cardiff City	2012–13	Championship	28	6	0	0	1	0	—		29	6
Cardiff City	2013–14	Premier League	0	0	1	0	2	0	—		3	0
Cardiff City	2014–15	Championship	7	1	—		0	0	—		7	1
Cardiff City	2015–16	Championship	24	6	1	0	0	0	—		25	6
Cardiff City	Total		98	22	3	1	7	2	2	0	110	25
Bolton Wanderers (loan)	2013–14	Championship	16	6	—		0	0	—		16	6
Bolton Wanderers (loan)	2014–15	Championship	12	4	0	0	2	0	—		14	4
Bolton Wanderers (loan)	Total		28	10	0	0	2	0	—		30	10
Wolverhampton Wanderers	2015–16	Championship	16	3	0	0	0	0	—		16	3
Wolverhampton Wanderers	2016–17	Championship	19	3	2	0	2	1	—		23	4
Wolverhampton Wanderers	2017–18	Championship	0	0	—		0	0	—		0	0
Wolverhampton Wanderers	2018–19	Premier League	0	0	—		0	0	—		0	0
Wolverhampton Wanderers	Total		35	6	2	0	2	1	—		39	7
Burton Albion (loan)	2017–18	Championship	6	1	0	0	1	0	—		7	1
Colorado Rapids (loan)	2018	Major League Soccer	14	3	—		—		—		14	3
Portsmouth (loan)	2018–19	League One	1	0	0	0	—		3 (Note: Appearances in EFL Trophy)	0	4	0
Milton Keynes Dons	2019–20	League One	13	3	1	0	—		2	1	16	4
Milton Keynes Dons	2020–21	League One	24	5	1	0	1	0	1	0	27	5
Milton Keynes Dons	Total		37	8	2	0	1	0	3	1	43	9
Cavalry FC	2021	Canadian Premier League	14	7	1	1	—		1 (Note: Appearance in Canadian Premier League playoffs)	0	16	8
Cavalry FC	2022	Canadian Premier League	20	8	0	0	—		2	0	22	8
Cavalry FC	2023	Canadian Premier League	17	0	1	0	—		3	1	21	1
Cavalry FC	Total		51	15	2	1	0	0	5	1	59	17
Career total			323	75	10	2	13	3	14	2	361	82

== Honours ==
Cardiff City

- Football League Championship: 2012–13
- Football League Cup runner-up: 2011–12

Cavalry

- CPL Shield: 2023

Individual

- Cardiff City Young Player of the Year: 2011–12
