= Ibrahim Farah =

Welsh footballer

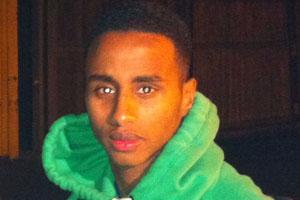
- Farah with Tamworth in November 2011

Personal information
- Date of birth: 24 January 1992 (age 34)
- Place of birth: Cardiff, Wales
- Position: Midfielder

Youth career
- 2008–2011: Cardiff City

Senior career*
Years	Team	Apps	(Gls)
2011–2012	Cardiff City	0	(0)
2011	→ Tamworth (loan)	3	(0)
2014	Carmarthen Town	2	(0)

International career
2010–2011	Wales U19	2	(0)
- * Club domestic league appearances and goals

Ibrahim Farah (born 24 January 1992) is a Welsh former professional footballer who last played as a midfielder for Carmarthen Town in the Welsh Premier League.

== Club career ==
=== Cardiff City ===
Farah is of Somali heritage. Born in the Butetown area of Cardiff, his family moved to the Splott area of the City shortly after he was born where he attended Moorland Primary School. Farah began his career with his home town side Cardiff City, joining their academy at the age of 14, whilst playing for his then local team against Cardiff City Academy who quickly signed him up after impressing. Alongside Nathaniel Jarvis and Alex Evans he signed schoolboy forms at the start of the 2008–09 season. On 23 May 2011, Farah was offered his first professional contract by Cardiff City alongside Alex Evans and Nathaniel Jarvis. Farah has been given the number 32 shirt for the upcoming season. He made his professional debut against Oxford United on 10 August, in the League Cup.

On 24 November 2011, Farah joined Conference National side Tamworth on an emergency loan deal. Cardiff allowed Tamworth to play Farah in the FA Cup and FA Trophy games.

In August 2012, Farah joined Birmingham City on trial with a view to a permanent move. He then confirmed he had left Cardiff City. He later confirmed that Cardiff manager Malky Mackay had used racist language during his time at the club.

In August 2014 Farah signed a contract with Carmarthen Town.

== International career ==
Farah was twice capped at Wales U19 level during their 2011 UEFA European Under-19 Championship qualification campaign. His first appearance came as a late replacement for Tom Bradshaw vs. Kazakhstan on 25 October 2010, before featuring against Moldova in the same competition's Elite Round on 3 May 2011.
