= Jordan Santiago =

Canadian soccer coach and former player (born 1991)

Personal information
- Full name: Jordan Christopher Santiago
- Date of birth: 3 April 1991 (age 35)
- Place of birth: Calgary, Alberta, Canada
- Height: 1.87 m (6 ft 2 in)
- Position: Goalkeeper

Team information
- Current team: Cavalry FC (goalkeeper coach)

Youth career
- Signal Hill SC
- 2003–2005: Calgary Chinooks
- 2005–2008: Calgary Blizzard SC
- 2008–2010: Cardiff City

Senior career*
Years	Team	Apps	(Gls)
2010–2012	Cardiff City	0	(0)
2012	SC Veendam	4	(0)
Total		4	(0)

International career^{‡}
2010–2011	Canada U20		
- * Club domestic league appearances and goals as of 24 April 2019 ‡ National team caps and goals as of 24 April 2019

Jordan Christopher Santiago (born 3 April 1991) is a Canadian soccer coach and former player who serves as a goalkeeper coach with Cavalry FC.

== Club career ==
=== Early career ===
Santiago began playing soccer at age four with Signal Hill SC. He later spent time with Calgary Blizzard SC before moving abroad. At age 15, Santiago received an offer to sign with English club Reading, but chose to stay in Calgary instead.

=== Cardiff City ===
In December 2007, Santiago signed a two-year youth contract with Welsh club Cardiff City.

Santiago signed his first professional contract with Cardiff in 2010 and would appear on the bench four times in the 2010–11 season, but did not make an appearance in his two seasons at the club.

=== SC Veendam ===
Santiago joined Dutch Eerste Divisie club SC Veendam for the 2012–13 season. On 23 November 2012, Santiago made his professional debut for Veendam in a match against Excelsior. He would make another three appearances that season before leaving the club in the winter.

After trailing and training with several clubs, Santiago elected to retire at age 22 after being offered a goalkeeper coaching position at West Ham United.

== International career ==
Santiago received his first Canadian youth national team call-up in August 2010 for the 2010 Torneo COTIF. He was subsequently called up for the 2011 CONCACAF U-20 Championship in April 2011, but did not make an appearance for Canada at the tournament.

== Coaching career ==
In 2013, Santiago joined West Ham United as a goalkeeper coach for the 2013–14 season.

In August 2014, Santiago returned to Calgary to continue his education and start his own coaching business. He would subsequently spend time as a goalkeeper coach for local club Calgary Rangers SC and Mount Royal University.

In 2018, Santiago joined Calgary Foothills as a goalkeeper coach.

In September 2018, Santiago joined fellow Foothills coaches Tommy Wheeldon Jr. and Martin Nash as a member of the inaugural coaching staff of Cavalry FC in the Canadian Premier League.

== Personal life ==
Santiago's father is from Madrid, Spain and his mother is from Calgary.
