= Nathaniel Jarvis =

Antigua and Barbuda international footballer

Nat Jarvis
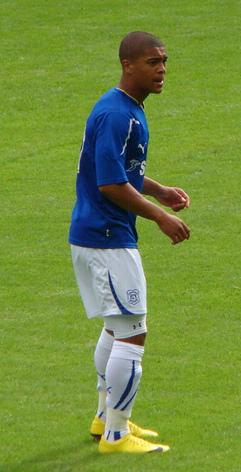
- Jarvis playing for Cardiff City

Personal information
- Full name: Nathaniel Stephen Jarvis
- Date of birth: 20 October 1991 (age 35)
- Place of birth: Cardiff, Wales
- Position: Striker

Team information
- Current team: Newport City

Youth career
- 1999–2010: Cardiff City

Senior career*
Years	Team	Apps	(Gls)
2010–2013	Cardiff City	0	(0)
2010	→ Southend United (loan)	6	(0)
2011–2012	→ Newport County (loan)	31	(6)
2012–2013	→ Forest Green Rovers (loan)	2	(0)
2013	→ Kidderminster Harriers (loan)	1	(0)
2013	Brackley Town	14	(0)
2013–2014	Bath City	2	(0)
2014	Gloucester City	16	(1)
2014	→ Cirencester Town (loan)	6	(4)
2014–2015	Cirencester Town	27	(19)
2015–2017	Hungerford Town	79	(29)
2017	Bath City	36	(6)
2018–2020	Chippenham Town	62	(20)
2020–2022	Barry Town United	54	(5)
2022–2024	Taunton Town	72	(5)
2024	Newport City	10	(5)
2024–2025	Tiverton Town	15	(1)
2025–	Newport City	0	(0)

International career^{‡}
2014–	Antigua and Barbuda	13	(3)
- * Club domestic league appearances and goals as of 19:23, 13 July 2025 (UTC) ‡ National team caps and goals as of 02:53, 2 May 2023 (UTC)

Nathaniel 'Nat' Stephen Jarvis (born 20 October 1991) is a footballer who plays as a striker for Newport City. Born in Wales, he plays for the Antigua and Barbuda national team.

== Early life ==
As a teenager, Jarvis grew up in Culverhouse Cross area of Cardiff and attended Ysgol Gymraeg Plasmawr.

== Club career ==
=== Cardiff City ===
Born in Cardiff, Jarvis began his career with his home town side Cardiff City, joining their academy at an early age of 8. Alongside Ibrahim Farah he signed schoolboy forms at the start of the 2008–09 season. Having finished as top scorer for the under-18 side during the 2009–10 season, he was named as a first team substitute in several matches at the start of the following year.

=== Southend United ===
On 24 September 2010, Jarvis joined Football League Two side Southend United on a one-month loan deal after impressing in a reserve match, making his professional debut as a substitute in place of Blair Sturrock during a 3–1 win over Hereford United. He went on to make a total of seven appearances in all competitions before returning to Cardiff.

=== Back to Cardiff ===
On 23 May 2011, Jarvis was offered his first professional contract by Cardiff City alongside Alex Evans and Ibrahim Farah. Jarvis scored his first professional goal in his competitive debut against Oxford United on 10 August 2011 in the League Cup by a 20-yard lobbed header.

On 9 September, Jarvis joined Conference National neighbours Newport County initially on a month-long loan. He made his debut the following day against Mansfield Town which County lost 5–0. Jarvis scored his first goal for Newport, against Barrow on 24 September. In January 2012 Jarvis rejoined Newport County on loan until the end of the 2011–12 season. On 12 May 2012 he played for Newport in the FA Trophy Final at Wembley Stadium which Newport lost 2–0 to York City.

On 20 November 2012, Jarvis joined Forest Green Rovers on loan until 5 January. He made his Forest Green debut on 8 December 2012, in a 1–1 draw with Macclesfield Town.

On 31 January 2013, 21-year-old Jarvis joined Kidderminster Harriers from Championship Leaders Cardiff City until the end of the season., the Harriers failed to gain promotion despite being top for most of Jarvis' loan spell. Following his return to Cardiff, the club told him he would not be offered a new contract.

=== Brackley Town ===
He signed for Brackley Town following his departure from Cardiff.

=== Bath City ===
In December 2013, he joined Bath City on a non-contract deal.

=== Gloucester City ===
Just a month later however, in January 2014, he joined Gloucester City. After a period on loan at Cirencester Town, he joined them in September 2014 on a permanent deal.

=== Chippenham Town ===
In June 2018, he joined National League South side Chippenham Town.

=== Barry Town United ===
In June 2020 Jarvis joined Barry Town United.

=== Taunton Town ===
In June 2022, Jarvis signed for newly promoted National League South Side Taunton Town.

=== Newport City ===
In June 2024, Jarvis joined Cymru South side Newport City.

=== Tiverton Town ===
In November 2024, Jarvis joined Southern League Premier Division South side Tiverton Town, the first signing following the appointment of Rob Dray whom managed Jarvis at Taunton Town.

In March 2025, Jarvis left Tiverton Town following the departure of Rob Dray.

=== Return to Newport City ===
In July 2025, Jarvis returned to Cymru South side Newport City.

== International career ==
Jarvis was asked to link up with the Antigua and Barbuda senior team on 1 September 2011 to play Curaçao and US Virgin Islands, who he qualifies for because of his grandfather. He was one of eight overseas based players who committed to represent the country in the summer of 2014. making his debut for the Antigua and Barbuda during 2014 Caribbean Cup qualification. He scored his first international goal on 5 September 2014 against the Dominican Republic.

== Career statistics ==
=== Club ===
As of end of 2024–25 season

Appearances and goals by club, season and competition
Club	Season	League			National Cup (Note: Includes FA Cup, Welsh Cup)		League Cup (Note: Includes League Cup, Welsh League Cup)		Other		Total	
Club	Season	Division	Apps	Goals	Apps	Goals	Apps	Goals	Apps	Goals	Apps	Goals
Cardiff City	2010–11	Championship	0	0	0	0	0	0	—		0	0
Cardiff City	2011–12	Championship	0	0	0	0	1	1	0	0	1	1
Cardiff City	2012–13	Championship	0	0	1	1	1	0	—		2	1
Cardiff City	Total		0	0	1	1	2	1	—		3	2
Southend United (loan)	2010–11	League Two	6	0	0	0	0	0	1 (Note: Appearances in Football League Trophy)	0	7	0
Newport County (loan)	2011–12	Conference Premier	31	6	2	1	—		6 (Note: Appearance(s) in FA Trophy)	2	39	9
Forest Green Rovers (loan)	2012–13	Conference Premier	2	0	—		—		0	0	2	0
Kidderminster Harriers (loan)	2012–13	Conference Premier	1	0	—		—		—		1	0
Brackley Town	2013–14	Conference North	4	0	6	0	—		1	0	11	0
Bath City	2013–14	Conference South	2	0	—		—		—		2	0
Gloucester City	2013–14	Conference North	15	1	—		—		—		15	1
Gloucester City	2014–15	Conference North	1	0	0	0	—		0	0	1	0
Gloucester City	Total		16	1	0	0	—		0	0	16	1
Cirencester Town (loan)	2014–15	Southern League Premier Division	6	4	—		—		—		6	4
Cirencester Town	2014–15	Southern League Premier Division	27	19	—		—		4 (Note: One appearance in FA Trophy, three appearances and one goal in Gloucestershire Senior Cup)	1	31	20
Hungerford Town	2015–16	Southern League Premier Division	41	18	2	0	—		9 (Note: Six appearances and one goal in FA Trophy, one appearance in Berks & Bucks Senior Cup, two appearances in Southern League Premier Division play-offs)	1	52	19
Hungerford Town	2016–17	National League South	38	11	2	0	—		1	0	41	11
Hungerford Town	Total		79	29	4	0	—		10	1	93	30
Bath City	2017–18	National League South	36	6	4	3	—		4 (Note: Two appearances in FA Trophy, two appearances in Somerset Premier Cup)	0	44	9
Chippenham Town	2018–19	National League South	42	17	5	4	—		3 (Note: Two appearances and goal in FA Trophy, one appearance in Wiltshire Senior Cup)	1	50	22
Chippenham Town	2019–20	National League South	20	3	6	2	—		1	0	27	5
Chippenham Town	Total		62	20	11	6	—		4	1	77	27
Barry Town United	2020–21	Cymru Premier	27	5	—		—		—		27	5
Barry Town United	2021–22	Cymru Premier	27	0	2	0	3	3	—		32	3
Barry Town United	Total		54	5	2	0	3	3	—		59	8
Taunton Town	2022–23	National League South	33	2	5	0	—		4 (Note: Three appearances and one goal in FA Trophy, one appearance in Somerset Premier Cup)	1	42	3
Taunton Town	2023–24	National League South	39	3	2	1	—		3 (Note: One appearances in FA Trophy, two appearances in Somerset Premier Cup)	0	44	4
Taunton Town	Total		72	5	7	1	—		7	1	86	7
Newport City	2024–25	Cymru South	10	5	0	0	1	0	0	0	11	5
Tiverton Town	2024–25	Southern League Premier Division South	15	1	0	0	—		0	0	15	1
Career total			423	101	37	12	6	4	37	6	510	123

=== International ===
As of match played 14 October 2019

Appearances and goals by national team and year
National team	Year	Apps	Goals
Antigua and Barbuda	2014	8	2
Antigua and Barbuda	2015	0	0
Antigua and Barbuda	2016	2	0
Antigua and Barbuda	2017	0	0
Antigua and Barbuda	2018	1	0
Antigua and Barbuda	2019	2	1
Total		13	3

Scores and results list Antigua and Barbuda's goal tally first, score column indicates score after each Jarvis goal.

List of international goals scored by Nathaniel Jarvis
No.	Date	Venue	Cap	Opponent	Score	Result	Competition	Ref.
1	5 September 2014	Antigua Recreation Ground, St. John's, Antigua and Barbuda	2	Dominican Republic	2–1	2–1	2015 CONCACAF Gold Cup qualification	
2	7 September 2014	Antigua Recreation Ground, St. John's, Antigua and Barbuda	3	Saint Vincent and the Grenadines	2–1	2–1	2015 CONCACAF Gold Cup qualification	
3	14 October 2019	Synthetic Track and Field Facility, Leonora, Guyana	13	Guyana	1–2	1–5	2019–20 CONCACAF Nations League B	

== Honours ==
Newport County

- FA Trophy runner-up: 2011–12
