= 2026–27 Cardiff City F.C. season =

Welsh football club season

Cardiff City
2026–27 season
- Owner: Vincent Tan
- Chairman: Mehmet Dalman
- Head coach: Brian Barry-Murphy
- Stadium: Cardiff City Stadium
- Championship: 15th
- EFL Cup: Second round
- Top goalscorer: League: Jack Moylan (10); All: Jack Moylan (11)
- Highest home attendance: 31,421 v Wrexham (17 August 2026)
- Lowest home attendance: 5,432 v Norwich City, 25 August, EFL Cup
- Average home league attendance: 22,051
Home colours	Away colours
- All statistics correct as of 21 November 2026.

The 2026–27 season is the 128th season in the history of Cardiff City Football Club and their first season being back in the Championship (second tier) since the 2024–25 season following promotion from League One in the preceding season. In addition to the domestic league, the club would also participate in the FA Cup, and the EFL Cup.

== Transfers and contracts ==
=== In ===
Date	Pos.	Player	From	Fee	Ref.
15 June 2026 (Note: The transfer was announced on 8 May, and would become official on June 15 once the transfer window opens)	GK	(England) Nathan Trott	(Denmark) Copenhagen	£1,500,000	
2 July 2026	CB	(Wales) Thierry Katsukunya	(England) Aston Villa	Free	
5 August 2026	CAM	(Republic of Ireland) Jack Moylan	(England) Lincoln City	Undisclosed	
26 August 2026	CB	(Poland) Krystian Bielik	(England) West Bromwich Albion	£2,500,000	
6 October 2026	CM	(England) Charlie Holt	(England) Manchester City	Free transfer	

=== Loaned in ===
Date	Pos.	Player	From	Loaned until	Ref.
15 August 2026	LB	(England) Calum Scanlon	(England) Liverpool	End of Season	

=== Loaned out ===
Date	Pos.	Player	To	Loaned until	Ref.
1 July 2026	GK	(Wales) Luke Armstrong	(Scotland) Raith Rovers	End of Season	
3 July 2026	GK	(Wales) Daniel Higgs	(Wales) Penybont	End of Season	
30 July 2026	CAM	(Wales) Trey George	(Republic of Ireland) Sligo Rovers	1 January 2027	
4 August 2026	CB	(Norway) Jesper Daland	(Norway) Viking	31 January 2027	
19 August 2026	CF	(Croatia) Roko Šimić	(Germany) Magdeburg	End of Season	
31 August 2026	CM	(Wales) Cody Twose	(Wales) Haverfordwest County	End of Season	
1 September 2026	LW	(Wales) Tanatswa Nyakuhwa	(Wales) Newport County	End of Season	
2 September 2026	CB	(Wales) Alyas Debono	(Wales) Penybont	End of Season	
2 September 2026	CF	(England) Kion Etete	(Wales) Newport County	End of Season	
3 September 2026	LB	(Wales) Luey Giles	(England) Kidderminster Harriers	End of Season	
6 September 2026	CB	(England) Caden Voice	(England) Weston-super-Mare	End of Season	
11 November 2026	CB	(Wales) Harri Davies	(Wales) Cambrian United	11 December 2026	
13 November 2026	GK	(Wales) Josh Donovan	(Wales) Pontypridd United	13 December 2026	

=== Out ===
Date	Pos.	Player	To	Fee	Ref.
30 August 2026	LW	(Wales) Axel Donczew	(England) Arsenal	£500,000	
1 September 2026	CDM	(Wales) Eli King	(England) Gillingham	Undisclosed	

=== Released / out of contract ===
Date	Pos.	Player	Subsequent club	Joined date	Ref.
30 June 2026	CB	(Scotland) Jack Kingdon	(England) Yeovil Town	1 July 2026	
30 June 2026	CF	(England) Leeyon Phelan	(United States) Angelina Roadrunners	1 July 2026	
30 June 2026	CB	(Wales) Oliver Reynolds	(United States) UCCS Mountain Lions	1 July 2026	
30 June 2026	RB	(Wales) Will Spiers	(Wales) Merthyr Town	1 July 2026	
30 June 2026	CF	(England) Michael Reindorf	(England) Farnborough	5 July 2026	
30 June 2026	CF	(Republic of Ireland) Luke Pearce	(Republic of Ireland) Sligo Rovers	9 July 2026	
30 June 2026	CDM	(England) Ryan Wintle	(England) Milton Keynes Dons	13 July 2026	
30 June 2026	CM	(England) Harry Watts	(England) Taunton Town	4 August 2026	
30 June 2026	LB	(Wales) Josh Beecher	(Wales) Cambrian United	12 August 2026	
30 June 2026	CM	(England) Jacob Hobson			
30 June 2026	GK	(Wales) Sam Jones			
30 June 2026	CB	(Wales) Oliver Walsh			
30 June 2026	LW	(Wales) Morgan Wigley	(Wales) Merthyr Town	1 July 2026	
13 August 2026	CM	(Scotland) Matthew Apter	(England) Macclesfield	29 August 2026	

=== New contract ===
Date	Pos.	Player	Contract expiry	Ref.
18 May 2026	RB	(England) Perry Ng	30 June 2028	
20 May 2026	LB	(Republic of Ireland) Joel Bagan	30 June 2030	
29 June 2026	GK	(Wales) Jake Dennis	Undisclosed	
29 June 2026	CAM	(Wales) Trey George	Undisclosed	
29 June 2026	GK	(Wales) Ewan Griffiths	Undisclosed	
29 June 2026	CAM	(Wales) Troy Perrett	Undisclosed	
1 July 2026 (Note: The contract was announced on 30 June, and would officially come into effect on July 1.)	CAM	(Wales) Hayden Allmark	Undisclosed (Note: First professional contract)	
1 July 2026	GK	(Wales) Daniel Higgs	Undisclosed	
1 July 2026	CF	(Wales) Riley Hilaire-Clarke	Undisclosed	
1 July 2026	CB	(Wales) T-Jay Parfitt	Undisclosed	
1 July 2026	CB	(Wales) Noah Williams	Undisclosed	
1 July 2026 (Note: The contract was announced on 12 June, and would officially come into effect on July 1.)	CM	(Wales) Rob Tankiewicz	Undisclosed	

== Pre-season and friendlies ==
On 20 May, Cardiff announced their a pre-season friendly, against Forest Green Rovers. Two days later, the club confirmed a home friendly against Midtjylland as the pre-season opener. A trip to Republic of Ireland to face Cork City was next to be added. On 24 June, it was announced that the Bluebirds would host AS Roma during pre-season.

Win Draw Loss Fixtures

11 July 2026 Friendly	Cardiff City	0–6	Midtjylland	Leckwith
12:30 BST		Report	Byskov 20'; Franculino 34'; Bak 39'; Etim 49', 50'; Brumado 56'	Stadium: Cardiff City Stadium

14 July 2026 Friendly	Cork City	1–6	Cardiff City	Turners Cross, Republic of Ireland
19:45 IST	Obenge 61'	Report	Robinson 40'; Davies 73', 83'; Tankiewicz 76', 88'; Salech 90'	Stadium: Turners Cross Stadium

25 July 2026 Friendly	Forest Green Rovers	1–5	Cardiff City	Nailsworth
15:00 BST	Kelly 68'; Kengni (yellow card) 73'	Report	Davies 9'; Willock 15', 22', 36' (pen.); Salech 24'; Turnbull (yellow card) 66'	Stadium: Bolt New Lawn

1 August 2026 Friendly	Cardiff City	4–1	Roma	Leckwith
15:00 BST	Ashford 3', 39'; Salech 30'; Tanner 63'	Report	Dybala (penalty missed) 35', 58'; Soulé (yellow card) 64'; Castro (yellow card) 64'; Ndicka (yellow card) 76'	Stadium: Cardiff City Stadium; Referee: Aaron Wyn-Jones

== Competitions ==
=== Overall record ===
Competition	First match	Last match	Starting round	Final position	Record							
Competition	First match	Last match	Starting round	Final position	Pld	W	D	L	GF	GA	GD	Win %
Championship	17 August 2026	May 2027	Matchday 1	TBC	16	4	6	6	28	29	−1	25.00
FA Cup	January 2027	TBC	Third round	TBC	0	0	0	0	0	0	+0	—
EFL Cup	8 August 2026	25 August 2026	First round	Second round	2	1	0	1	4	4	+0	50.00
Total					18	5	6	7	32	33	−1	27.78

Last updated: 21 November 2026
Source: Soccerway

=== Championship ===
==== League table ====
Pos	Team	Pld	W	D	L	GF	GA	GD	Pts
13	Blackburn Rovers	15	6	3	6	22	23	−1	21
14	Wrexham	16	5	6	5	19	20	−1	21
15	Cardiff City	16	4	6	6	28	29	−1	18
16	Millwall	16	5	3	8	23	28	−5	18
17	Bolton Wanderers	16	5	3	8	21	30	−9	18

Updated to match(es) played on 21 November 2026. Source: EFL Official Website
Rules for classification: 1) Points; 2) Goal difference; 3) Number of goals scored; 4) Head-to-head results; 5) Wins; 6) Away goals; 7) Penalty points (sec 9.5); 8) Number of 12-point sending off offences; 9) Play-off (only if needed to determine promotion/relegation)

==== Results summary ====
Overall								Home						Away					
Pld	W	D	L	GF	GA	GD	Pts	W	D	L	GF	GA	GD	W	D	L	GF	GA	GD
16	4	6	6	28	29	−1	18	4	4	0	21	13	+8	0	2	6	7	16	−9

Last updated: 21 November 2026.
Source: Soccerway

==== Results by round ====
Round	1	2	3	4	5	6	7	8	9	10	11	12	13	14	15	16	17	18	19	20	21	22	23	24	25	26	27	28	29	30	31	32
Ground	H	A	H	A	A	H	A	H	A	H	A	H	A	H	H	A	H	A	H	A	H	A	H	A	A	H	H	A	A	H	H	A
Result	D	D	D	L	L	D	L	W	L	W	D	W	L	D	W	L																
Position	13	12	13	19	22	20	21	21	21	19	19	16	17	18	14	15																
Points	1	2	3	3	3	4	4	7	7	10	11	14	14	15	18	18																

Source: EFL
A = Away; H = Home; W = Win; D = Draw; L = Loss; P = Postponed

==== Matches ====
On 25 June, the Championship fixtures were revealed.

Win Draw Loss Fixtures

17 August 2026 1	Cardiff City	1–1	Wrexham	Cardiff
20:00 BST	R. Colwill 90+8'	BBC report Sky report	Moore 3', (yellow card) 33'; Hyam (yellow card) 54'	Stadium: Cardiff City Stadium; Attendance: 31,421 (3,000 away); Referee: Andrew Kitchen
Note: Live on Sky TV

22 August 2026 2	Derby County	2–2	Cardiff City	Derby
15:00 BST	Morris 26'; Clark 49'	BBC report Sky report	Ashford 19'; Salech 39'	Stadium: Pride Park Stadium; Attendance: 28,926; Referee: Ruebyn Ricardo

29 August 2026 3	Cardiff City	2–2	Sheffield United	Cardiff
15:00 BST	Moylan 2', (yellow card) 33'; Robertson (yellow card) 4'; Ashford 38'	BBC report Sky report	Cannon 4' (pen.); O'Hare 7'; McGuinness (yellow card) 10'; Peck (yellow card) 75'	Stadium: Cardiff City Stadium; Attendance: 21,036; Referee: John Busby

2 September 2026 4	Queens Park Rangers	2–1	Cardiff City	Shepherd's Bush
19:45 BST	Burrell 36', 53'	BBC report Sky report	Tanner (yellow card) 47'; Ng 74', (yellow card) 77'	Stadium: MATRADE Loftus Road; Attendance: 15,027; Referee: Tim Robinson
Note: Live on Sky Sports+

5 September 2026 5	Portsmouth	2–0	Cardiff City	Milton
15:00 BST	Shaughnessy 31'; Milovanović 52'	BBC report Sky report	Bielik (yellow card) 9'; Tanner (yellow card) 60'; Robertson (yellow card) 86'; Salech (yellow card) 90+2'	Stadium: Fratton Park; Attendance: 20,459 (2,184 away); Referee: Ben Speedie

8 September 2026 6	Cardiff City	1–1	Stoke City	Cardiff
19:45 BST	Ng (yellow card) 45+2'; J. Colwill 63'	BBC report Sky report	Johnson 22'; Wilmot (yellow card) 27'; Graham (yellow card) 81'	Stadium: Cardiff City Stadium; Attendance: 18,088; Referee: Samuel Allison

12 September 2026 7	Bolton Wanderers	1–0	Cardiff City	Horwich
12:30 BST	Davies (yellow card) 31'; Dong (yellow card) 32'; Iling-Junior (yellow card) 37'; Nelson (yellow card) 78'; Gale 90', (yellow card) 90+1'	BBC report Sky report	J. Colwill (yellow card) 42'; Ng (yellow card) 54'	Stadium: Toughsheet Community Stadium; Attendance: 21,543; Referee: Thomas Parsons
Note: Fixture was initially scheduled for a 15:00 kick-off, but was brought forward for live Sky Sports.

19 September 2026 8	Cardiff City	3–1	Charlton Athletic	Cardiff
12:30 BST	Moylan 8', 61'; Salech 24'; Robertson (yellow card) 27'; Tanner (yellow card) 33'; Bagan (yellow card) 45+5'; Ashford (yellow card) 90+4'; R. Colwill (yellow card) 90+6'	BBC report Sky report	Campbell 29'; McNamara (yellow card) 35'; Skipp (yellow card) 51'; Mesík (yellow card) 90+4'	Stadium: Cardiff City Stadium; Attendance: 21,108 (1,841 away); Referee: Elliot Bell
Note: Fixture was initially scheduled for a 15:00 kick-off, but was brought forward for live Sky Sports.

10 October 2026 9	Blackburn Rovers	2–1	Cardiff City	Blackburn
15:00 BST	Guðjohnsen 28'; Cantwell 38'	BBC report Sky report	Robinson 53'	Stadium: Ewood Park; Attendance: 13,334 (1,666 away); Referee: Anthony Backhouse

13 October 2026 10	Cardiff City	5–1	Watford	Cardiff
19:45 BST	Moylan 11' (pen.), 35'; Pollock 41' (o.g.); Tanner 45+5'; Willock (penalty missed) 65'; Robinson 85'; Ng (yellow card) 86'	BBC report Sky report	Payero (yellow card) 9'; Kayembe (yellow card) 73'; Nabizada (yellow card) 86'; Kyprianou 87', (yellow card) 90+5'	Stadium: Cardiff City Stadium; Attendance: 17,921; Referee: John Busby
Note: Live on Sky Sports+

17 October 2026 11	Middlesbrough	2–2	Cardiff City	Middlesbrough
12:30 BST	Conway 58'; Lankshear 61'	BBC report Sky report	Moylan 22', (yellow card) 88'; Bagan (yellow card) 25'; Tanner 45+1'; Osho (red card) 83'	Stadium: Riverside Stadium; Attendance: 28,991; Referee: Tom Nield
Note: Fixture was initially scheduled for a 15:00 kick-off, but was brought forward for live Sky Sports broadcasting.

24 October 2026 12	Cardiff City	1–0	Birmingham City	Cardiff
15:00 BST	Salech (penalty missed) 22', 31'; Bagan (yellow card) 82'	BBC report Sky report	Solís (yellow card) 50'; Klarer (yellow card) 81'	Stadium: Cardiff City Stadium; Attendance: 23,280; Referee: Tim Robinson

31 October 2026 13	Wolverhampton Wanderers	3–0	Cardiff City	Wolverhampton
15:00 GMT	López 15', (yellow card) 50'; Armstrong 15', (yellow card) 26'; André (yellow card) 42'; Krejčí 58'; Bellegarde (yellow card) 62'	BBC report Sky report	Bagan (yellow card) 56'; R. Colwill (yellow card) 90+2'	Stadium: Molineux Stadium; Attendance: 29,852; Referee: Josh Smith

4 November 2026 14	Cardiff City	3–3	West Ham United	Cardiff
19:45 GMT	Moylan 11', 37' (pen.), 39'	BBC report Sky report EFL report	Mukasa 58'; Engels 65'; Kilman (yellow card) 23', (goal) 82'; Magassa (yellow card) 25'; Veltman (yellow card) 84'	Stadium: Cardiff City Stadium; Attendance: 24,902 (3,219 away); Referee: Edward Duckworth

7 November 2026 15	Cardiff City	5–4	Burnley	Cardiff
15:00 GMT	Tanner 40'; Bielik (yellow card) 50'; Salech 65', 82', (yellow card) 90+13'; Moylan 75' (pen.); Bagan (yellow card) 79'; Robertson 90+4'; R. Colwill (yellow card) 90+11'	BBC report Sky report Club report	Hountondji 15'; Edwards 25'; Ramazani 55', (yellow card) 79'; Robertson 62' (o.g.); Walker (yellow card) 90+9'; Laurent (yellow card) 90+11'	Stadium: Cardiff City Stadium; Attendance: 19,462; Referee: Oliver Langford

21 November 2026 16	Norwich City	2–1	Cardiff City	Norwich
12:30 GMT	Maghoma 62'; Kvistgaarden 68'	BBC report Sky report	Salech 48'	Stadium: Carrow Road; Attendance: 25,433; Referee: Matt Donohue
Note: Fixture was initially scheduled for a 15:00 kick-off, but was brought forward for live Sky Sports broadcasting.

24 November 2026 17	Cardiff City	v	Preston North End	Cardiff
19:45 GMT		Sky report		Stadium: Cardiff City Stadium

29 November 2026 18	Swansea City	v	Cardiff City	Landore
12:00 GMT		Sky report		Stadium: Swansea.com Stadium
Note: Fixture was initially scheduled for 28 November, but was pushed back to lunchtime the next day for live Sky Sports broadcasting.

5 December 2026 19	Cardiff City	v	Lincoln City	Cardiff
15:00 GMT		Sky report		Stadium: Cardiff City Stadium

8 December 2026 20	West Bromwich Albion	v	Cardiff City	West Bromwich
19:45 GMT		Sky report		Stadium: The Hawthorns

12 December 2026 21	Cardiff City	v	Southampton	Cardiff
15:00 GMT		Sky report		Stadium: Cardiff City Stadium

19 December 2026 22	Bristol City	v	Cardiff City	Ashton Gate
12:30 GMT		Sky report		Stadium: Ashton Gate Stadium
Note: Fixture was initially scheduled for a 15:00 kick-off, but was brought forward following advice from local police.

26 December 2026 23	Cardiff City	v	Millwall	Cardiff
15:00 GMT		Sky report		Stadium: Cardiff City Stadium

29 December 2026 24	Birmingham City	v	Cardiff City	Bordesley
20:00 GMT		Sky report		Stadium: St Andrew's @ Knighthead Park

1 January 2027 25	Southampton	v	Cardiff City	Southampton
15:00 GMT		Sky report		Stadium: St Mary's Stadium

16 January 2027 26	Cardiff City	v	Middlesbrough	Cardiff
15:00 GMT		Sky report		Stadium: Cardiff City Stadium

24 January 2027 27	Cardiff City	v	Wolverhampton Wanderers	Cardiff
12:00 GMT		Sky report		Stadium: Cardiff City Stadium
Note: Fixture was initially scheduled for 23 January, but was pushed back a day for live Sky Sports broadcasting.

27 January 2027 28	West Ham United	v	Cardiff City	Stratford
19:45 GMT		Sky report		Stadium: London Stadium

30 January 2027 29	Burnley	v	Cardiff City	Burnley
15:00 GMT		Sky report		Stadium: Turf Moor

6 February 2027 30	Cardiff City	v	Norwich City	Cardiff
15:00 GMT		Sky report		Stadium: Cardiff City Stadium

14 February 2027 31	Cardiff City	v	Bolton Wanderers	Cardiff
12:00 GMT		Sky report		Stadium: Cardiff City Stadium
Note: Fixture was initially scheduled for 13 February, but was pushed back a day for live Sky Sports broadcasting.

17 February 2027 32	Watford	v	Cardiff City	Watford
20:00 GMT		Sky report		Stadium: Vicarage Road
Note: Fixture was initially scheduled for a 19:45 kick-off, but was pushed for live Sky Sports broadcasting.

=== FA Cup ===
Win Draw Loss Fixtures

=== EFL Cup ===
Cardiff were drawn at home to Swindon Town in the first round and to Norwich City in the second round.

Win Draw Loss Fixtures

8 August 2026 First round	Cardiff City	3–2	Swindon Town	Leckwith, Cardiff
15:00 BST	Salech 29' (pen.), 43'; Moylan 77'; J Colwill (yellow card) 82'	BBC report Sky report	Osho 9' (o.g.); Glatzel 62'; Debayo (yellow card) 84' (yellow-red card) 90'	Stadium: Cardiff City Stadium; Attendance: Grant Ward; Referee: 6,168

25 August 2026 Second round	Cardiff City	1–2	Norwich City	Leckwith, Cardiff
19:00 BST	Ng (yellow card) 27'; Davies (yellow card) 33'; Colwill (yellow card) 84'; Salech 90+3'	BBC report Sky report	Kvistgaarden 25'; Mattsson (yellow card) 50'; Crnac 78'	Stadium: Cardiff City Stadium; Attendance: 5,432; Referee: Gavin Ward
Note: Live on Sky Sports+

== Statistics ==
=== Appearances and goals ===
As of match played 21 November 2026

Players with no appearances are not included on the list; italics indicate loaned in player

No.	Pos	Nat	Player	Total		Championship		FA Cup		EFL Cup	
No.	Pos	Nat	Player	Apps	Goals	Apps	Goals	Apps	Goals	Apps	Goals
1	GK	(Bermuda) BER	Nathan Trott	18	0	16+0	0	0+0	0	2+0	0
2	DF	(England) ENG	Will Fish	7	0	5+2	0	0+0	0	0+0	0
3	DF	(Republic of Ireland) IRL	Joel Bagan	17	0	15+0	0	0+0	0	2+0	0
4	DF	(Nigeria) NGR	Gabriel Osho	11	0	10+0	0	0+0	0	1+0	0
5	DF	(Poland) POL	Krystian Bielik	9	0	8+1	0	0+0	0	0+0	0
8	MF	(Republic of Ireland) IRL	Jack Moylan	18	11	16+0	10	0+0	0	0+2	1
9	FW	(Denmark) DEN	Yousef Salech	15	9	12+1	6	0+0	0	1+1	3
10	MF	(Wales) WAL	Rubin Colwill	10	1	6+3	1	0+0	0	0+1	0
11	MF	(England) ENG	Ollie Tanner	17	3	16+0	3	0+0	0	1+0	0
14	MF	(Scotland) SCO	David Turnbull	13	0	1+10	0	0+0	0	2+0	0
16	FW	(England) ENG	Chris Willock	18	0	11+5	0	0+0	0	1+1	0
18	MF	(Australia) AUS	Alex Robertson	18	1	16+0	1	0+0	0	2+0	0
23	DF	(England) ENG	Calum Scanlon	15	0	7+8	0	0+0	0	0+0	0
27	MF	(Wales) WAL	Joel Colwill	18	1	9+7	1	0+0	0	1+1	0
33	MF	(Wales) WAL	Rob Tankiewicz	1	0	0+0	0	0+0	0	0+1	0
38	DF	(Singapore) SGP	Perry Ng	16	1	14+0	1	0+0	0	2+0	0
39	FW	(Wales) WAL	Isaak Davies	10	0	0+8	0	0+0	0	2+0	0
40	DF	(Wales) WAL	Noah Anyadike	1	0	0+0	0	0+0	0	1+0	0
44	DF	(Wales) WAL	Ronan Kpakio	12	0	4+6	0	0+0	0	2+0	0
45	FW	(Wales) WAL	Cian Ashford	18	2	9+7	2	0+0	0	1+1	0
47	FW	(Republic of Ireland) IRL	Callum Robinson	7	2	1+5	2	0+0	0	1+0	0
48	DF	(Wales) WAL	Dylan Lawlor	3	0	2+1	0	0+0	0	0+0	0
50	MF	(England) ENG	Charlie Holt	1	0	0+1	0	0+0	0	0+0	0

=== Assists record ===
As of match played 21 November 2026

Rank	No.	Nat.	Pos.	Name	Championship	FA Cup	EFL Cup	Total
1	11	(England)	FW	Ollie Tanner	4	0	0	4
1	45	(Wales)	FW	Cian Ashford	3	0	1	4
3	8	(Republic of Ireland)	MF	Jack Moylan	3	0	0	3
3	10	(Wales)	MF	Rubin Colwill	3	0	0	3
5	3	(Republic of Ireland)	DF	Joel Bagan	2	0	0	2
5	9	(Denmark)	FW	Yousef Salech	1	0	1	2
5	16	(England)	FW	Chris Willock	2	0	0	2
5	18	(Australia)	MF	Alex Robertson	2	0	0	2
7	14	(Scotland)	MF	David Turnbull	1	0	0	1
7	38	(England)	DF	Perry Ng	1	0	0	1
7	44	(Wales)	DF	Ronan Kpakio	1	0	0	1
Total					22	0	2	24

=== Disciplinary record ===
As of match played 21 November 2026

Rank	No.	Nat.	Pos.	Name	Championship			FA Cup			EFL Cup			Total		
Rank	No.	Nat.	Pos.	Name	Yellow card	(yellow card) (yellow-red card)	Red card	Yellow card	(yellow card) (yellow-red card)	Red card	Yellow card	(yellow card) (yellow-red card)	Red card	Yellow card	(yellow card) (yellow-red card)	Red card
1	3	(Republic of Ireland)	DF	Joel Bagan	5	0	0	0	0	0	0	0	0	5	0	0
1	38	(England)	DF	Perry Ng	4	0	0	0	0	0	1	0	0	5	0	0
3	10	(Wales)	MF	Rubin Colwill	3	0	0	0	0	0	1	0	0	4	0	0
3	18	(Australia)	MF	Alex Robertson	4	0	0	0	0	0	0	0	0	4	0	0
5	4	(Nigeria)	DF	Gabriel Osho	0	0	1	0	0	0	0	0	0	0	0	1
5	5	(Poland)	DF	Krystian Bielik	3	0	0	0	0	0	0	0	0	3	0	0
5	11	(England)	FW	Ollie Tanner	3	0	0	0	0	0	0	0	0	3	0	0
5	27	(Wales)	MF	Joel Colwill	2	0	0	0	0	0	1	0	0	3	0	0
9	8	(Republic of Ireland)	MF	Jack Moylan	2	0	0	0	0	0	0	0	0	2	0	0
9	9	(Denmark)	FW	Yousef Salech	2	0	0	0	0	0	0	0	0	2	0	0
11	39	(Wales)	FW	Isaak Davies	0	0	0	0	0	0	1	0	0	1	0	0
11	45	(Wales)	FW	Cian Ashford	1	0	0	0	0	0	0	0	0	1	0	0
Total					30	0	1	0	0	0	4	0	0	34	0	1

=== Clean sheets ===
As of match played 21 November 2026

Rank	No.	Nat.	Name	Championship	FA Cup	EFL Cup	Total
1	1	(England)	Nathan Trott	1	0	0	1
Total				1	0	0	1

== Awards ==
=== Player awards ===
==== PFA Player of the Month ====
Month	Player	Result	Ref.
October	(Republic of Ireland) Jack Moylan	Nominated	
