= Joel Bagan =

Professional footballer

Personal information
- Full name: Joel Matthew Bagan
- Date of birth: 3 September 2001 (age 25)
- Place of birth: Basingstoke, England
- Height: 6 ft 0 in (1.83 m)
- Position: Left-back

Team information
- Current team: Cardiff City
- Number: 3

Youth career
- Southampton
- 2018–2020: Cardiff City

Senior career*
Years	Team	Apps	(Gls)
2020–	Cardiff City	125	(4)
2020	→ Notts County (loan)	2	(0)
2023–2024	→ Zulte Waregem (loan)	21	(0)

International career^{‡}
2017	Scotland U16		
2021–2022	Republic of Ireland U21	8	(0)
2026–	Republic of Ireland	2	(0)
- * Club domestic league appearances and goals as of 8 November 2026 (UTC) ‡ National team caps and goals as of 21:50, 4 October 2026 (UTC)

Joel Matthew Bagan (born 3 September 2001) is a professional footballer who plays for EFL Championship club Cardiff City. He also playing for the Republic of Ireland national team.

== Club career ==
Bagan began his career with Southampton before joining Cardiff City during the 2018–19 season. He made his professional debut in a penalty shootout defeat to Reading in the FA Cup on 4 February 2020.

On 14 February 2020, Bagan joined Notts County on a one-month loan deal.

Bagan made his league debut for Cardiff on 21 October 2020 in a 1–1 draw with AFC Bournemouth. He scored his first professional goal against Millwall on 12 February 2022.

On 11 August 2023, Bagan joined Zulte Waregem in Belgium on loan.

== International career ==
Born in England, Bagan is of Scottish and Irish descent. He has represented Scotland at youth level. On 27 August 2021, it was announced that Bagan had switched international allegiance when he was called up to the Republic of Ireland U21 team for their 2023 UEFA European Under-21 Championship qualifiers against Bosnia and Herzegovina and Luxembourg. He made his Ireland under-21 debut in a 1–1 draw with Luxembourg at the Stade Jos Nosbaum in Dudelange on 7 September 2021.

On 5 May 2026, Bagan was called up to the Republic of Ireland senior team for a friendly against Grenada in Murcia, Spain, but had to withdraw from the squad due to injury.

He made his senior Republic of Ireland debut in a 3–0 win over Israel in the UEFA Nations League on 27 September 2026, coming off the bench in the 88th minute.

== Career statistics ==
=== Club ===
As of match played 19 September 2026

Appearances and goals by club, season and competition
Club	Season	League			FA Cup		League Cup		Other		Total	
Club	Season	Division	Apps	Goals	Apps	Goals	Apps	Goals	Apps	Goals	Apps	Goals
Cardiff City	2019–20	Championship	0	0	1	0	0	0	—		1	0
Cardiff City	2020–21	Championship	7	0	1	0	0	0	—		8	0
Cardiff City	2021–22	Championship	26	3	2	0	0	0	—		28	3
Cardiff City	2022–23	Championship	1	0	2	0	1	0	—		4	0
Cardiff City	2023–24	Championship	0	0	0	0	1	0	—		1	0
Cardiff City	2024–25	Championship	31	0	3	0	2	0	—		36	0
Cardiff City	2025–26	League One	45	1	1	0	5	0	1 (Note: One appearance in EFL Trophy)	0	52	1
Cardiff City	2026–27	Championship	8	0	0	0	2	0	—		10	0
Cardiff City	Total		118	4	10	0	11	0	1	0	140	4
Notts County (loan)	2019–20	National League	2	0	0	0	0	0	2 (Note: Two appearances in National League Play-offs)	0	4	0
Zulte Waregem (loan)	2023–24	Challenger Pro League	21	0	3	0	—		—		24	0
Career total			141	4	13	0	11	0	3	0	168	4

=== International ===
As of match played on 4 October 2026

Appearances and goals by national team and year
National team	Year	Apps	Goals
Republic of Ireland	2026	2	0
Total		2	0

== Honours ==
Individual

- EFL League One Team of the Season: 2025–26
