= Ollie Tanner =

English footballer (born 2002)

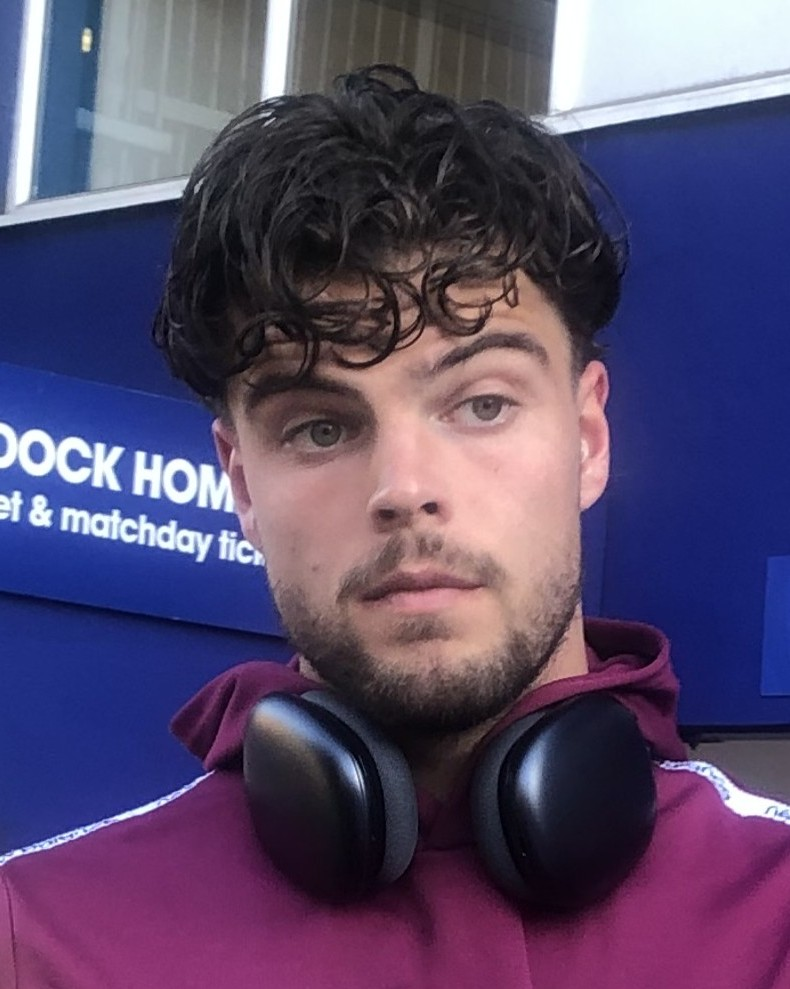
- Tanner in 2025

Personal information
- Full name: Oliver Anthony Tanner
- Date of birth: 13 May 2002 (age 24)
- Place of birth: Bromley, England
- Height: 6 ft 1 in (1.85 m)
- Position: Winger

Team information
- Current team: Cardiff City
- Number: 11

Youth career
- Charlton Athletic
- Arsenal
- 2015–2019: Bromley

Senior career*
Years	Team	Apps	(Gls)
2019–2021	Bromley	2	(0)
2020	→ Folkestone Invicta (dual reg.)	4	(0)
2021–2022	Lewes	34	(13)
2022–	Cardiff City	109	(10)
2023	→ York City (loan)	6	(0)
- * Club domestic league appearances and goals as of 09:12, 22 November 2026 (UTC)

Oliver Anthony Tanner (born 13 May 2002) is an English professional footballer who plays as a winger for EFL Championship club Cardiff City.

Tanner played youth football for Charlton Athletic, Arsenal, and Bromley, where he began his senior career. After a dual registration with Folkestone Invicta, he signed for Lewes. He turned professional with Cardiff City, spending a loan spell at York City.

== Career ==
=== Bromley ===
Born in Bromley, Tanner played youth football for Charlton Athletic and Arsenal. He joined the Bromley Academy in 2015 after being released from Arsenal. He made his league debut for Bromley on 23 November 2019 in a 2–0 win over Sutton United. He made two appearances for Bromley in his debut season. The following season, shortly after signing a first-team contract, his dual registration move to Folkestone Invicta was announced on 9 October 2020. He made his Folkestone debut the following day in a 1–0 win over Potters Bar Town. He finished his time at Folkestone with 5 appearances. He was released by Bromley at the end of the season.

=== Lewes ===
Following his release from Bromley, he signed for Lewes in the summer of 2021. He scored on his debut on 14 August, in a 3–1 defeat to Cray Wanderers. After 7 goals and becoming an important part of the team, in November he extended his contract until the end of the 2022–23 season, with manager Tony Russell saying that "[Tanner] is probably the best young player I have ever worked with. And I have worked with some good ones." Amidst interest from multiple clubs, it was reported that Lewes had accepted a £100,000 bid from Premier League club Tottenham Hotspur in January 2022. However, Tanner turned down the transfer after failing to agree personal terms, leading to him receiving death threats from Tottenham fans. He finished the season with 13 goals in 35 games, and won both Lewes Supporter's Player of the Season and Goal of the Season for a goal against Margate.

=== Cardiff ===
In May 2022, it was announced that Tanner would sign for Cardiff City on 10 June on a two-year contract, following a successful trial, for a reported fee of around £50,000. He made his Cardiff debut in the EFL Cup on 9 August, in a 3–0 defeat to Portsmouth.

On 9 January 2023, Tanner joined National League club York City on loan for the remainder of the season. He made his York debut on 24 January in a 2–0 defeat to Oldham Athletic. He lost his place in the team following the sacking of manager David Webb. He finished his loan, having failed to score in 6 appearances. He later said, "that loan spell was tough mentally and being on my own up there, not having much contact with family."

After impressing recently hired Cardiff manager Erol Bulut in pre-season, he made his league debut for Cardiff on 12 August 2023, in a 2–1 defeat to Queens Park Rangers. He scored his first professional goal on 16 September 2023 in Cardiff's 2–0 home victory against South Wales derby rivals Swansea City. He finished the season with 40 appearances and 2 goals, although primarily appeared as a substitute with only 9 league starts.

In the next season, Bulut told Tanner he would have to lose weight to gain a starting spot. Tanner suffered a cut on his leg after an advertising board fell on him on 25 August in a 1–1 draw against Swansea. He signed a three-year contract extension on 5 October 2024. Under new manager Omer Riza, Tanner became an important part of the Cardiff team. After missing more than two months with a knee injury, he made his return on 29 March 2025 in a 1–1 against Sheffield Wednesday. He finished the season with 31 appearances and 2 goals as the Bluebirds were relegated to League One.

On 5 August 2025, Tanner signed a new four-year deal with the club. Two weeks later however, he collided with an advertising board during a 1–0 victory over AFC Wimbledon, suffering damaged ankle ligaments and a small fracture in his fibula, expected to rule him out for four months.

In February 2026, Tanner scored the opening goal in a 2–1 victory against Bristol City, marking his first goal in a Severnside derby."

== Career statistics ==
As of match played 21 November 2026

Appearances and goals by club, season and competition
Club	Season	League			FA Cup		EFL Cup		Other		Total	
Club	Season	Division	Apps	Goals	Apps	Goals	Apps	Goals	Apps	Goals	Apps	Goals
Bromley	2019–20	National League	2	0	0	0	—		1 (Note: Appearance(s) in the FA Trophy.)	0	3	0
Bromley	2020–21	National League	0	0	0	0	—		0	0	0	0
Bromley	Total		2	0	0	0	—		1	0	3	0
Folkestone Invicta (dual reg.)	2020–21	Isthmian League Premier Division	4	0	—		—		1	0	5	0
Lewes	2021–22	Isthmian League Premier Division	32	13	1	0	—		2 (Note: One appearance in the FA Trophy, one appearance in the Sussex Senior Cup)	0	35	13
Cardiff City	2022–23	Championship	0	0	1	0	1	0	—		2	0
Cardiff City	2023–24	Championship	36	2	1	0	3	0	—		40	2
Cardiff City	2024–25	Championship	29	2	1	0	1	0	—		31	2
Cardiff City	2025–26	League One	28	3	0	0	1	0	0	0	29	3
Cardiff City	2026–27	Championship	16	3	0	0	1	0	—		17	3
Cardiff City	Total		109	10	3	0	6	0	0	0	118	10
York City (loan)	2022–23	National League	6	0	—		—		1	0	7	0
Career total			153	23	4	0	7	0	5	0	169	23
