= Kieron Evans =

Welsh footballer (born 2001)

Personal information
- Full name: Kieron Thomas Evans
- Date of birth: 19 December 2001 (age 24)
- Place of birth: Brithdir, Wales
- Height: 1.70 m (5 ft 7 in)
- Position: Midfielder

Team information
- Current team: Newport County
- Number: 7

Youth career
- 2007–2020: Cardiff City

Senior career*
Years	Team	Apps	(Gls)
2020–2025	Cardiff City	5	(0)
2022	→ Linfield (loan)	5	(0)
2022–2023	→ Torquay United (loan)	36	(2)
2024	→ Gateshead (loan)	16	(3)
2024–2025	→ Newport County (loan)	34	(2)
2025–2026	Eastleigh	38	(2)
2026–	Newport County	9	(0)

International career^{‡}
2020	Wales U20	1	(0)
- * Club domestic league appearances and goals as of 14:50, 21 November 2026 (UTC) ‡ National team caps and goals as of 2 October 2022 (UTC)

Kieron Thomas Evans (born 19 December 2001) is a Welsh professional footballer who plays as a midfielder for EFL League Two club Newport County.

== Career ==
=== Cardiff City ===
Evans began his career as a youth player at Cardiff City joining the academy at under 10s level. In the 2019–20 season Evans was the top scorer for Cardiff's under 18s which brought him to the attention of first team manager Neil Harris. Subsequently, he was selected in the first team squad for a EFL Cup first round match against Northampton Town but was an unused substitute. He was selected for his first league squad in December 2020 but was again an unused substitute. Evans made his first team debut on 12 September 2021 as an 87th minute substitute for fellow Cardiff City academy graduate Mark Harris in a 2–1 victory over Nottingham Forest.

On 31 January 2022 Evans joined Linfield on loan for the remainder of the 2021–22 season.

On 30 June 2022 Evans joined Torquay United on loan for the 2022-23 season.

On 17 January 2024, Evans joined National League club Gateshead on loan until the end of the season.

On 7 June 2024, Cardiff said it had offered the player a new contract. In August 2024, he joined League Two club Newport County on a season-long loan deal. Evans made his debut for Newport on 24 August 2024 in the 3-1 League Two win against Accrington Stanley. He scored his first goal for Newport on 3 September 2024 in the 2-1 EFL Trophy defeat to Cheltenham Town.

=== Eastleigh ===
On 26 June 2025 Evans joined National League club Eastleigh

=== Newport County ===
In July 2026 Evans rejoined Newport County on a permanent contract.

== Career statistics ==
As of match played 29 December 2024

Appearances and goals by club, season and competition
Club	Season	League			FA Cup		EFL Cup		Other		Total	
Club	Season	Division	Apps	Goals	Apps	Goals	Apps	Goals	Apps	Goals	Apps	Goals
Cardiff City	2021–22	Championship	5	0	1	0	0	0	—		6	0
Cardiff City	2022–23	Championship	0	0	0	0	0	0	—		0	0
Cardiff City	2023–24	Championship	0	0	1	0	3	0	—		4	0
Cardiff City	2024–25	Championship	0	0	0	0	1	0	—		1	0
Cardiff City	Total		5	0	2	0	4	0	0	0	11	0
Linfield (loan)	2021–22	NIFL Premiership	5	0	1	0	0	0	0	0	6	0
Torquay United (loan)	2022–23	National League	36	2	0	0	0	0	3 (Note: Appearances in FA Trophy)	1	39	3
Gateshead (loan)	2023–24	National League	16	3	0	0	0	0	0	0	16	3
Newport County (loan)	2024–25	League Two	20	1	1	0	0	0	3 (Note: Appearances in EFL Trophy)	1	24	2
Career total			82	6	4	0	4	0	6	2	96	8

== Honours ==
Gateshead

- FA Trophy: 2023–24
