= Raheem Conte =

English footballer (born 2002)

Personal information
- Full name: Raheem Evangelista Conte
- Date of birth: 11 November 2002 (age 24)
- Place of birth: Brent, England
- Position: Defender

Team information
- Current team: FC Halifax Town

Youth career
- Brentford
- –2022: Queens Park Rangers
- 2022–2024: Cardiff City

Senior career*
Years	Team	Apps	(Gls)
2024–2025	Cardiff City	3	(0)
2024–2025	→ Woking (loan)	8	(0)
2025–2026	Morecambe	17	(0)
2026–	FC Halifax Town	0	(0)
- * Club domestic league appearances and goals as of 16:45, 7 August 2026 (UTC)

Raheem Evangelista Conte (born 11 November 2002) is an English professional footballer who plays as a defender for National League club FC Halifax Town.

== Early life ==
Conte attended Christ's College, Finchley.

== Career ==
Having previously spent time with Brentford, Conte joined Queens Park Rangers at under-14s level, signing a two-year scholarship in July 2019. At the end of the 2021–22 season, he rejected the offer of a short-term contract.

In August 2022, Conte joined fellow Championship club Cardiff City on a one-year deal, exercising an extension option the following summer following an injury-affected first year. On 20 April 2024, Conte made his senior debut as a substitute in a 2–1 victory over Southampton. Having been introduced in a less-familiar right-back position, Conte impressed, playing a role in his side's equaliser.

On 7 June 2024, the club said it had offered the player a new contract.

On 31 August 2024, Conte joined National League club Woking on a season-long loan deal. On 11 January 2024, it was announced that Conte had returned to Cardiff, ending his loan spell six months early.

On 20 August 2025, Conte joined Morecamble as the third signing made under manager Ashvir Singh Johal. On 16 May 2026, Morecambe announced he was being released.

In August 2026, Conte returned to the National League following Morecambe's relegation the previous season, joining FC Halifax Town.

== Career statistics ==
As of match played 7 January 2025

Appearances and goals by club, season and competition
Club	Season	League			FA Cup		League Cup		Other		Total	
Club	Season	Division	Apps	Goals	Apps	Goals	Apps	Goals	Apps	Goals	Apps	Goals
Cardiff City	2023–24	Championship	3	0	0	0	0	0	—		3	0
Cardiff City	2024–25	Championship	0	0	0	0	2	0	—		2	0
Cardiff City	Total		3	0	0	0	2	0	0	0	5	0
Woking (Loan)	2024–25	National League	8	0	2	0	—		3 (Note: One appearance in FA Trophy; Two Appearances in National League Cup)	0	13	0
Career total			11	0	2	0	2	0	3	0	19	0
