= Michael Reindorf =

English footballer (born 2005)

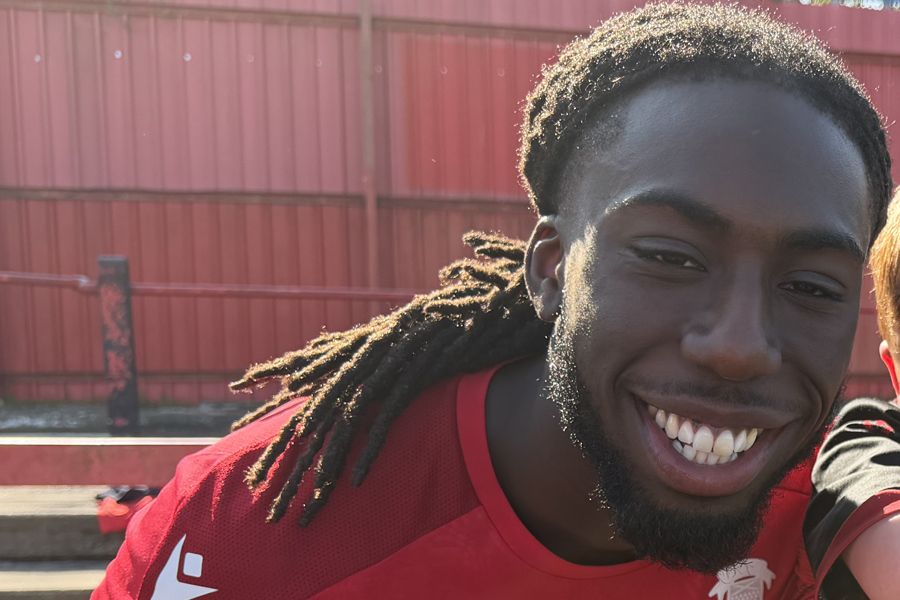
- Reindorf with Tamworth in April 2026

Personal information
- Full name: Michael Douglas Kwabena Amponsah Reindorf Junior
- Date of birth: 10 May 2005 (age 21)
- Place of birth: Waltham Forest, England
- Height: 1.80 m (5 ft 11 in)
- Position: Forward

Team information
- Current team: Kidderminster Harriers

Youth career
- 2014–2015: West Ham United
- 2019–2021: Leyton Orient
- 2021–2024: Norwich City

Senior career*
Years	Team	Apps	(Gls)
2024	Norwich City	0	(0)
2024	→ Kettering Town (loan)	12	(2)
2024–2026	Cardiff City	2	(0)
2025	→ Bristol Rovers (loan)	4	(0)
2025–2026	→ Newport County (loan)	16	(0)
2026	→ Tamworth (loan)	9	(0)
2026	Farnborough	8	(1)
2026–	Kidderminster Harriers	0	(0)
- * Club domestic league appearances and goals as of 18:35, 22 October 2026 (UTC)

Michael Douglas Kwabena Amponsah Reindorf Junior (born 10 May 2005) is an English professional footballer who plays as a forward for Kidderminster Harriers in the National League.

== Club career ==
Reindorf is a youth product of West Ham United, Leyton Orient and Norwich City. On 7 July 2023, Reindorf signed his first professional contract with Norwich. In February 2024, he joined Kettering Town on a short-term loan in the Southern Football League.

Reindorf was released by Norwich City in the summer of 2024, and signed with Cardiff City on 4 July 2024. He made his league debut with Cardiff City as a substitute in a 2–2 EFL Championship tie with Coventry City on 30 November 2024. On 3 February 2025, Reindorf joined League One club Bristol Rovers on loan for the remainder of the season. Having made three substitute appearances immediately after joining the club, he would struggle for further minutes, manager Iñigo Calderón revealing that bad performances in training resulted in the loanee dropping down the order. On 27 June 2025, Reindorf joined League Two side Newport County on a season-long loan deal. He made his debut for Newport in the EFL Cup preliminary round win against Barnet on 29 July 2025, scoring Newport's second goal on his debut. On 6 January 2026 Reindorf's loan at Newport was terminated early. Reindorf signed for National League side Tamworth on 3 February 2026, on a loan deal until the end of the season. Michael made his debut for Tamworth on the same day in a Birmingham Senior Cup victory over Alvechurch, with Tamworth running out 2-1 winners. Reindorf was released by Cardiff City at the end of the 2025-26 season.

On 5 July 2026, Reindorf joined National League South club Farnborough after impressing during a pre-season trial, scoring twice in a friendly against Cobham the previous day. He departed the club on 22 October 2026 by mutual consent to join Kidderminster Harriers on a short-term deal.

== Personal life ==
Born in England, Reindorf is of Ghanaian descent.

== Playing style ==
Primarily a centre-forward, Reindorf is also capable of playing as a left winger.

== Career statistics ==
As of match played 26 September 2026

Appearances and goals by club, season and competition
Club	Season	League			FA Cup		EFL Cup		Other		Total	
Club	Season	Division	Apps	Goals	Apps	Goals	Apps	Goals	Apps	Goals	Apps	Goals
Norwich City	2023–24	Championship	0	0	0	0	0	0	0	0	0	0
Kettering Town (loan)	2023–24	Southern League Premier Division Central	12	2	—		—		—		12	2
Cardiff City	2024–25	Championship	2	0	0	0	2	0	—		4	0
Cardiff City	2025–26	League One	0	0	0	0	0	0	0	0	0	0
Cardiff City	Total		2	0	0	0	2	0	0	0	4	0
Bristol Rovers (loan)	2024–25	League One	4	0	—		—		—		4	0
Newport County (loan)	2025–26	League Two	16	0	2	0	2	1	2 (Note: Appearances in EFL Trophy)	0	22	1
Tamworth (loan)	2025–26	National League	9	0	—		—		1 (Note: Appearances in National League Cup)	0	10	0
Farnborough	2026–27	National League South	8	1	2	1	—		0	0	10	2
Kidderminster Harriers	2026–27	National League	0	0	0	0	—		0	0	0	0
Career total			51	3	4	1	4	1	3	0	62	5
