= Luke Pearce (footballer) =

Irish association football player (born 2004)

Personal information
- Full name: Luke Edward Andrew Pearce
- Date of birth: 8 June 2004 (age 22)
- Place of birth: England
- Position: Forward

Team information
- Current team: Sligo Rovers
- Number: 9

Youth career
- –2020: Walsall
- 2020–2024: Southampton

Senior career*
Years	Team	Apps	(Gls)
2022–2024	Southampton	0	(0)
2022–2023	→ Eastbourne Borough (loan)	17	(6)
2023	→ Torquay United (loan)	3	(0)
2023	→ Weston-super-Mare (loan)	5	(2)
2024	→ Dover Athletic (loan)	2	(0)
2024–2026	Cardiff City	0	(0)
2024	→ Sligo Rovers (loan)	11	(2)
2026–	→ IFK Mariehamn (loan)	12	(0)
2026–	Sligo Rovers	11	(0)

International career
2021	Republic of Ireland U18	4	(1)
2021	Republic of Ireland U19	2	(0)
- * Club domestic league appearances and goals as of 11:20, 10 November 2026 (UTC)

Luke Edward Andrew Pearce (born 8 June 2004) is a professional footballer who plays as a forward for League of Ireland Premier Division club Sligo Rovers. He is a former Republic of Ireland youth international.

== Club career ==
He began his career at Walsall before moving to Southampton, and signed his first professional contract with the club in July 2021. Pearce scored 30 goals from 71 games for their youth teams including six in nine in Premier League 2 during the 2023–24 season. He spent time on loan at Eastbourne Borough, Torquay United, Weston-Super-Mare and Dover Athletic. Pearce was released from Southampton at the end of the 2023–24 season.

On 4 July 2024, he joined Cardiff City. Pearce joined Sligo Rovers on loan in the League of Ireland on 16 July until the end of the season. On 9 January 2025, Pearce made his debut for Cardiff in a 1–0 away victory against Sheffield United in the FA Cup. On 21 February 2026, Pearce joined Veikkausliiga club IFK Mariehamn on loan until 30 June 2026.

On 9 July 2026, Pearce returned to Sligo Rovers on a permanent basis, signing an 18-month contract with the club. He scored 2 goals in 14 appearances in all competitions by the end of the 2026 season as the club finished bottom of the league and were relegated to play in the League of Ireland First Division for the first time since 2006.

== International career ==
He represented the Republic of Ireland at youth level.

== Personal life ==
His mother's side of the family is from Sligo.

== Career statistics ==
As of match played 23 October 2026

Appearances and goals by club, season and competition
Club	Season	League			National Cup (Note: Includes FA Cup, FAI Cup & Finnish Cup)		League Cup (Note: Includes EFL Cup, Welsh League Cup & Finnish League Cup)		Other		Total	
Club	Season	Division	Apps	Goals	Apps	Goals	Apps	Goals	Apps	Goals	Apps	Goals
Southampton U21	2022–23	—	—		—		—		3 (Note: Appearance(s) in the EFL Trophy)	0	3	0
Eastbourne Borough (loan)	2022–23	National League South	17	6	—		—		0	0	17	6
Torquay United (loan)	2023–24	National League South	3	0	—		—		0	0	3	0
Weston-super-Mare (loan)	2023–24	National League South	5	1	—		—		0	0	5	1
Dover Athletic (loan)	2023–24	National League South	2	0	—		—		1 (Note: Appearances in FA Trophy)	0	3	0
Cardiff City	2024–25	Championship	0	0	1	0	0	0	—		1	0
Cardiff City	2025–26	League One	0	0	0	0	0	0	2 (Note: Appearance in EFL Trophy)	0	2	0
Cardiff City	Total		0	0	1	0	0	0	2	0	3	0
Sligo Rovers (loan)	2024	League of Ireland Premier Division	11	2	2	0	—		—		13	2
Cardiff City U23	2025–26	—	—		—		2	0	—		2	0
IFK Mariehamn (loan)	2026	Veikkausliiga	12	0	2	0	1	2	—		15	2
Sligo Rovers	2026	League of Ireland Premier Division	11	0	3	2	—		—		14	2
Career total			61	9	8	2	3	2	6	0	77	13
