= 2024–25 Cardiff City F.C. season =

Welsh football club season

Cardiff City
2024–25 season
- Owner: Vincent Tan
- Chairman: Mehmet Dalman
- Manager: Erol Bulut (until 22 September); Omer Riza (interim 22 Sep-5 Dec); Omer Riza (from 5 December to 19 April); Aaron Ramsey (interim from 19 April)
- Stadium: Cardiff City Stadium
- Championship: 24th (relegated)
- FA Cup: Fifth round
- EFL Cup: Second round
- Top goalscorer: League: Callum Robinson (12); All: Callum Robinson (12)
- Highest home attendance: 26,536 v Swansea City (18 January 2025, Championship)
- Lowest home attendance: 5,718 v Bristol Rovers (13 August 2024, EFL Cup)
- Average home league attendance: 19,344
- Biggest win: 5–0 v Plymouth Argyle (H) (19 October 2024, Championship)
- Biggest defeat: 7–0 v Leeds United (A) (01 February 2025, Championship)
Home colours	Away colours	Third colours
- All statistics correct as of 3 May 2025.

The 2024–25 season was the 126th season in the history of Cardiff City Football Club and their sixth consecutive season in the Championship. In addition to the domestic league, the club would also participate in the FA Cup and the EFL Cup.

== Transfers ==
=== In ===
Date	Pos.	Player	From	Fee	Ref.
4 July 2024	GK	(Wales) Ewan Griffiths (Note: Signed initially for the U21s)	(Wales) Swansea City	Free	
4 July 2024	CF	(Republic of Ireland) Luke Pearce	(England) Southampton	Free	
4 July 2024	AM	(England) Michael Reindorf	(England) Norwich City	Free	
12 July 2024	LW	(England) Chris Willock	(England) Queens Park Rangers	Free	
14 July 2024	CB	(England) Calum Chambers	(England) Aston Villa	Free	
31 July 2024	RW	(Netherlands) Anwar El Ghazi	(Germany) Mainz 05	Free	
6 August 2024	LW	(England) Baylin Johnson	(England) Bournemouth	Free	
7 August 2024	CM	(Australia) Alexander Robertson	(England) Manchester City	Undisclosed	
20 August 2024	CB	(Norway) Jesper Daland	(Belgium) Cercle Brugge	Undisclosed	
23 August 2024	CB	(England) Will Fish	(England) Manchester United	Undisclosed	
30 August 2024	CF	(Croatia) Roko Šimić	(Austria) Red Bull Salzburg	Undisclosed	
17 January 2025	CF	(Denmark) Yousef Salech	(Sweden) Sirius	Undisclosed	
5 March 2025	CF	(Guinea) Sekou Kaba	(England) Manchester United	Free	

=== Out ===
Date	Pos.	Player	To	Fee	Ref.
10 July 2024	CM	(England) Cameron Antwi	(Wales) Newport County	Undisclosed	
17 July 2024	CM	(The Gambia) Ebou Adams	(England) Derby County	Undisclosed	
26 July 2024	LW	(Wales) Japhet Matondo	(England) Stoke City	Undisclosed	
20 August 2024	CB	(Republic of Ireland) Mark McGuinness	(England) Luton Town	Undisclosed	
1 January 2025 (Note: The transfer was announced on 24 December, but would come official on January 1 once the transfer window reopened)	CB	(England) Malachi Fagan-Walcott	(England) York City	Undisclosed	
17 January 2025	LB	(Wales) Thomas Davies	(Wales) Newport County	Undisclosed	
31 January 2025	DM	(Greece) Manolis Siopis	(Greece) Panathinaikos	Undisclosed	

=== Loaned in ===
Date	Pos.	Player	From	Date until	Ref.
30 July 2024	CF	(Ivory Coast) Wilfried Kanga	(Germany) Hertha BSC	20 January 2025 (Note: On 20 January, Kanga was recalled back to his parent club Hertha BSC)	
28 January 2025	DM	(Norway) Sivert Mannsverk	(Netherlands) Ajax	End of Season	
3 February 2025	AM	(England) Will Alves	(England) Leicester City	End of Season	

=== Loaned out ===
Date	Pos.	Player	To	Date until	Ref.
16 July 2024	CF	(Republic of Ireland) Luke Pearce	(Republic of Ireland) Sligo Rovers	30 November 2024	
2 August 2024	CM	(Wales) Joel Colwill	(England) Cheltenham Town	10 January 2025 (Note: On 10 January, Colwill was recalled back from his loan at Cheltenham)	
22 August 2024	DM	(Wales) Eli King	(England) Stevenage	End of Season	
23 August 2024	AM	(Wales) Kieron Evans	(Wales) Newport County	End of Season	
28 August 2024	DM	(England) Ryan Wintle	(England) Millwall	End of Season	
30 August 2024	LB	(Wales) Josh Beecher	(Wales) Barry Town United	1 January 2025	
31 August 2024	CM	(England) Raheem Conte	(England) Woking	End of Season	
31 August 2024	GK	(Wales) Ewan Griffiths	(England) Plymouth Parkway	1 January 2025	
31 August 2024	CF	(Croatia) Roko Šimić	(Belgium) Kortrijk	End of Season	
2 September 2024	CB	(England) Malachi Fagan-Walcott	(England) York City	1 January 2025 (Note: On 24 December, it was announced that Fagan-Walcott would sign for York permanently.)	
6 January 2025	CB	(Japan) Ryotaro Tsunoda	(Belgium) Kortrijk	End of Season	
12 January 2025	CM	(Wales) Joel Colwill	(England) Exeter City	End of Season	
13 January 2025	GK	(Wales) Jake Dennis	(England) Oldham Athletic	End of Season	
17 January 2025	GK	(Wales) Joe Thomas	(England) Yate Town	End of Season	
24 January 2025	LW	(England) Baylin Johnson	(England) Maidstone United	End of Season	
31 January 2025	CF	(England) Kion Etete	(England) Bolton Wanderers	End of Season	
3 February 2025	CF	(England) Michael Reindorf	(England) Bristol Rovers	End of Season	

=== Released / out of contract ===
Date	Pos.	Player	Subsequent club	Join date	Ref.
30 June 2024	CF	(Wales) James Crole	(Wales) Penybont	1 July 2024	
30 June 2024	CB	(Wales) Oliver Denham	(Republic of Ireland) Sligo Rovers	1 July 2024	
30 June 2024	CM	(Wales) Kyle Kenniford	(Wales) Haverfordwest County	24 July 2024	
30 June 2024	CF	(England) Finlay Johnson	(England) South Park	3 August 2024	
30 June 2024	GK	(England) Rohan Luthra	(England) Derby County	7 August 2024	
30 June 2024	RB	(Ghana) Jai Semenyo	(England) Eastleigh	7 August 2024	
30 June 2024	CM	(Wales) Ryan Kavanagh	(Wales) Barry Town	11 August 2024	
30 June 2024	RW	(England) Sheyi Ojo	(Slovenia) Maribor	6 September 2024	
30 June 2024	CF	(Zambia) Chanka Zimba	(England) Marine	13 September 2024	
30 June 2024	RB	(England) Xavier Benjamin	(England) Enfield Town	19 September 2024	
30 June 2024	DM	(Wales) Caleb Hughes	(England) Yeovil Town	25 October 2024	
30 June 2024	AM	(Saint Kitts and Nevis) Romaine Sawyers	(England) AFC Wimbledon	5 December 2024	
30 August 2024	RB	(Antigua and Barbuda) Mahlon Romeo			

== Current squad ==
As of 3 May 2025

Note: Flags indicate national team as has been defined under FIFA eligibility rules. Players may hold more than one non-FIFA nationality.

No.	Name	Nat.	Position(s)	Date of birth (age)	Apps.	Goals	Year signed	Signed from	Transfer fee	Ends
Goalkeepers
1	Ethan Horvath	(United States)	GK	9 June 1995 (age 31)	36	0	2024	(England) Nottingham Forest	Undisclosed	2027
21	Jak Alnwick	(England)	GK	17 June 1993 (age 33)	63	0	2022	(Scotland) St Mirren	Free	2026
41	Matthew Turner	(Wales)	GK	27 March 2002 (age 24)	0	0	2021	(England) Leeds United	Free	2026
Defenders
2	Will Fish	(England)	CB	17 February 2003 (age 23)	24	0	2024	(England) Manchester United	Undisclosed	2028
4	Dimitrios Goutas	(Greece)	CB	4 April 1994 (age 32)	81	5	2023	(Turkey) Sivasspor	Free	2025
5	Jesper Daland	(Norway)	CB	6 January 2000 (age 26)	22	0	2024	(Belgium) Cercle Brugge	Undisclosed	2028
12	Calum Chambers	(England)	CB/RB/DM	20 January 1995 (age 31)	42	2	2024	(England) Aston Villa	Free	2027
17	Jamilu Collins	(Nigeria)	LB/CB/LM	5 August 1994 (age 32)	43	1	2022	(Germany) SC Paderborn	Free	2025
23	Joel Bagan	(Republic of Ireland) (England)	LB	3 September 2001 (age 25)	78	3	2020	Academy	Trainee	2026
38	Perry Ng	(England) (Singapore)	RB/LB/CB	27 April 1996 (age 30)	181	9	2021	(England) Crewe Alexandra	£350,000	2026
Midfielders
8	Joe Ralls	(England)	CM/LM/DM	12 October 1993 (age 33)	409	34	2011	Academy	Trainee	2025
10	Aaron Ramsey	(Wales)	CM/AM	26 December 1990 (age 35)	51	6	2023	(France) Nice	Free	2025
11	Callum O'Dowda	(Republic of Ireland) (England)	LW/AM/RW/LWB	23 April 1995 (age 31)	94	6	2022	(England) Bristol City	Free	2028
14	David Turnbull	(Scotland)	AM	10 July 1999 (age 27)	36	1	2024	(Scotland) Celtic	Undisclosed	2027
15	Sivert Mannsverk	(Norway)	CM	8 May 2002 (age 24)	15	0	2025	(Netherlands) Ajax	Loan	2025
18	Alex Robertson	(Australia) (Scotland)	CM/AMDM	17 April 2003 (age 23)	39	4	2024	(England) Manchester City	Undisclosed	2028
27	Rubin Colwill	(Wales)	AM/LW/RW	27 April 2002 (age 24)	153	14	2020	Academy	Trainee	2027
32	Ollie Tanner	(England)	LW/AM/RW	13 May 2002 (age 24)	71	4	2022	(England) Lewes	£50,000	2027
35	Andy Rinomhota	(Zimbabwe)	CM/DM/RM	21 April 1997 (age 29)	82	0	2022	(England) Reading	Free	2025
45	Cian Ashford	(Wales)	AM	24 September 2004 (age 22)	40	4	2022	Academy	Trainee	2027
Forwards
16	Chris Willock	(England)	LW/RW/AM	31 January 1998 (age 28)	34	2	2024	(England) Queens Park Rangers	Free	2027
19	Yakou Méïté	(Ivory Coast) (France)	LW/CF/RW	11 February 1996 (age 30)	71	5	2023	(England) Reading	Free	2025
20	Anwar El Ghazi	(Netherlands) (Morocco)	RW/LW/CF	3 May 1995 (age 31)	27	3	2024	(Germany) Mainz 05	Free	2025
22	Yousef Salech	(Denmark)	CF	17 January 2002 (age 24)	22	9	2025	(Sweden) IK Sirius	Undisclosed	2029
29	Will Alves	(England)	LW	May 4, 2005 (age 21)	15	1	2025	(England) Leicester City	Loan	2025
39	Isaak Davies	(Wales)	SS/RW/LW	25 September 2001 (age 25)	52	6	2020	Academy	Trainee	2025
47	Callum Robinson	(Republic of Ireland)	LW/CF/RW	2 February 1995 (age 31)	82	23	2022	(England) West Bromwich Albion	£1,500,000	2027
Out on Loan
6	Ryan Wintle	(England)	DM/CM/CB	13 June 1997 (age 29)	117	5	2021	(England) Crewe Alexandra	Free	2026
9	Kion Etete	(England) (Nigeria)	CF/SS	28 November 2001 (age 24)	62	9	2022	(England) Tottenham Hotspur	£500,000	2025
24	Eli King	(England)	DM/CM	23 December 2002 (age 23)	8	0	2021	Academy	Trainee	2026
25	Kieron Evans	(Wales)	AM	19 December 2001 (age 24)	12	1	2020	Academy	Trainee	2025
33	Ryotaro Tsunoda	(Japan)	CB/LB	27 June 1999 (age 27)	0	0	2024	(Japan) Yokohama F. Marinos	Undisclosed	
34	Joel Colwill	(Wales)	CM	27 October 2004 (age 22)	5	0	2022	Academy	Trainee	2028
36	Raheem Conte	(England)	DM/RB	11 November 2002 (age 24)	5	0	2022	(England) Queens Park Rangers	Trainee	2025

== Pre-season and friendlies ==
On 21 June, Cardiff City announced their first four pre-season friendlies, against Kidderminster Harriers, KV Kortrijk, Penybont and Reading. Four days later, a fifth fixture was added, against Bristol Rovers. In July, a pre-season training camp in Austria was announced along with friendly matches against Hamburger SV, Hertha BSC and Mamelodi Sundowns.

Win Draw Loss Fixtures

10 July 2024 Friendly	Cardiff City	0–1	Kidderminster Harriers	Canton
19:30 BST		Report	Colwill 44' (o.g.)	Stadium: Cardiff International Sports Stadium

13 July 2024 Friendly	Cardiff City	3–1	KV Kortrijk	Canton
12:00 BST	Davies (pen.); Collins; Colwill	Report	Kaneko	Stadium: Cardiff International Sports Stadium

16 July 2024 Friendly	Cardiff City	7–1	Penybont	Canton
19:30 BST	Robinson 7', 31'; O'Dowda 33'; Conte 51'; Evans 53'; Ashford 82', 88'	Report	58'	Stadium: Cardiff International Sports Stadium

21 July 2024 Friendly	Hamburger SV	0–3	Cardiff City	Bramberg am Wildkogel, Austria
16:00 CEST (15:00 BST)		Report	Tanner 48'; Davies 69'; Robinson 89'	Stadium: Smaragd-Arena

23 July 2024 Friendly	Mamelodi Sundowns	1–1	Cardiff City	Wörgl, Austria
16:00 CEST (15:00 BST)	Matthews 75'	Report	Colwill 47'	Stadium: Sportzentrum
Note: Fixture was initially scheduled to take place at Waldstadion but was switched to Sportzentrum in Wörgl.

25 July 2024 Friendly	Hertha BSC	1–1	Cardiff City	St. Johann in Tirol, Austria
18:00 CEST (17:00 BST)	Gechter 8'	Report	Robinson 88'	Stadium: Koasastadion St. Johann

31 July 2024 Friendly	Cardiff City	2–1	Reading	Leckwith
19:30 BST	Robinson 4', 78'	Report	Azeez 12'	Stadium: Cardiff City Stadium

3 August 2024 Friendly	Bristol Rovers	0–2	Cardiff City	Horfield
15:00 BST		Report	Ramsey 28'; Ralls 56'	Stadium: Memorial Stadium

== Competitions ==
=== Championship ===
==== League table ====
Pos	Team	Pld	W	D	L	GF	GA	GD	Pts	Promotion, qualification or relegation
20	Preston North End	46	10	20	16	48	59	−11	50	
21	Hull City	46	12	13	21	44	54	−10	49	
22	Luton Town (R)	46	13	10	23	45	69	−24	49	Relegation to EFL League One
23	Plymouth Argyle (R)	46	11	13	22	51	88	−37	46	Relegation to EFL League One
24	Cardiff City (R)	46	9	17	20	48	73	−25	44	Relegation to EFL League One

Source: English Football League
Rules for classification: 1) Points; 2) Goal difference; 3) Number of goals scored; 4) Head-to-head results; 5) Wins; 6) Away goals; 7) Penalty points (sec 9.5); 8) Number of 12-point sending off offences; 9) Play-off (only if needed to determine promotion/relegation)
(R) Relegated

==== Results summary ====
Overall								Home						Away					
Pld	W	D	L	GF	GA	GD	Pts	W	D	L	GF	GA	GD	W	D	L	GF	GA	GD
46	9	17	20	48	73	−25	44	7	6	10	24	27	−3	2	11	10	24	46	−22

Last updated: complete.
Source: Soccerway

==== Results by round ====
Round	1	2	3	4	5	6	7	8	9	10	11	12	13	14	15	16	17	18	20	21	22	23	24	25	26	19^{1}	27	28	29	30	32	33	34	31^{2}	35	36	37	38	39	40	41	42	43	44	45	46
Ground	H	A	A	H	A	H	A	H	A	H	H	A	H	A	H	A	H	A	H	A	H	A	A	H	A	H	H	A	H	A	A	H	A	H	H	A	H	A	H	A	A	H	A	H	H	A
Result	L	L	D	L	L	L	L	W	D	W	W	D	W	L	L	D	L	D	L	D	L	L	W	D	D	D	W	D	W	L	L	D	D	W	L	L	L	W	D	D	D	L	L	D	D	L
Position	20	24	24	24	24	24	24	24	24	22	20	20	17	21	22	21	21	20	22	21	22	23	22	23	23	21	20	20	18	19	20	20	21	19	21	21	21	21	21	22	22	22	23	23	24	24
Points	0	0	1	1	1	1	1	4	5	8	11	12	15	15	15	16	16	17	17	18	18	18	21	22	23	24	27	28	31	31	31	32	33	36	36	36	36	39	40	41	42	42	42	43	44	44

Source: EFL
A = Away; H = Home; W = Win; D = Draw; L = Loss; P = Postponed
Notes:
- ^{1} Matchday 19 (vs. Watford) was postponed due to advice from the Met Office, Cardiff Council and South Wales Police
- ^{2} Matchday 31 (vs. Hull City) was postponed due to FA Cup involvements

==== Matches ====
On 26 June, the Championship fixtures were announced.

Win Draw Loss Fixtures

10 August 2024 1	Cardiff City	0–2	Sunderland	Leckwith
12:30 BST		BBC report Sky report	O'Nien 18'; Hume (yellow card) 51'; Alese (yellow card) 81'; Clarke 89'	Stadium: Cardiff City Stadium; Attendance: 21,401; Referee: Andy Davies
Note: Live on Sky TV

17 August 2024 2	Burnley	5–0	Cardiff City	Burnley
15:00 BST	Horvath 9' (o.g.); Koleosho 31'; Foster (yellow card) 42'; Brownhill 51'; Estève (yellow card) 59'; Amdouni 88'; Guðmundsson 90+2'	BBC report Sky report	Ramsey (yellow card) 42'	Stadium: Turf Moor; Attendance: 19,759; Referee: Michael Salisbury

25 August 2024 3	Swansea City	1–1	Cardiff City	Landore
15:00 BST	Cullen 10'; Allen (yellow card) 90+7'; Darling (yellow card) 90+10'	BBC report Sky report EFL report	Robinson 79'; Ng (yellow card) 90+10'; Colwill (yellow card) 90+10'	Stadium: Swansea.com Stadium; Attendance: 20,174; Referee: Oliver Langford
Note: Fixture was initially scheduled for 24 August, but was moved for live Sky Sports broadcast.

31 August 2024 4	Cardiff City	0–2	Middlesbrough	Leckwith
12:30 BST	Siopis (yellow card) 5'; Daland (yellow card) 39'	BBC report Sky report	Clarke 55'; Morris (yellow card) 69', (goal) 82'	Stadium: Cardiff City Stadium; Attendance: 18,000; Referee: David Webb
Note: Fixture was initially scheduled for a 15:00 kick-off, but was moved for live Sky Sports broadcast.

14 September 2024 5	Derby County	1–0	Cardiff City	Derby
15:00 BST	Goudmijn 28'	BBC report Sky report		Stadium: Pride Park Stadium; Attendance: 28,985; Referee: Matt Donohue

21 September 2024 6	Cardiff City	0–2	Leeds United	Leckwith
15:00 BST		BBC report Sky report	Ramazani 30'; Piroe 87'	Stadium: Cardiff City Stadium; Attendance: 23,207; Referee: Josh Smith

28 September 2024 7	Hull City	4–1	Cardiff City	Kingston upon Hull
15:00 BST	Belloumi 22', 35'; McLoughlin (yellow card) 28'; Zambrano 51'; Slater (yellow card) 69'; Mehlem (yellow card) 76'; Bedia 90+1' (pen.)	BBC report Sky report	Fish (yellow card) 13'; Robinson 18'; Collins (yellow card) 22'; O'Dowda (yellow card) 57'; Ng (yellow card) 75'	Stadium: MKM Stadium; Attendance: 22,665; Referee: Leigh Doughty

1 October 2024 8	Cardiff City	1–0	Millwall	Leckwith
19:45 BST	Chambers (yellow card) 26'; Ng 39'	BBC report Sky report	De Norre (yellow card) 64'; Cooper (yellow card) 87'; Leonard (yellow card) 90+1'	Stadium: Cardiff City Stadium; Attendance: 15,687; Referee: Gavin Ward
Note: Live on Sky Sports Extra

6 October 2024 9	Bristol City	1–1	Cardiff City	Ashton Gate
15:00 BST	McNally 73'	BBC report Sky report	Tanner 54'; Ralls (yellow card) 65'	Stadium: Ashton Gate; Attendance: 22,664; Referee: Bobby Madley
Note: Fixture was initially scheduled for 5 October, but was moved for live Sky Sports broadcast.

19 October 2024 10	Cardiff City	5–0	Plymouth Argyle	Leckwith
12:30 BST	A. Robertson 16', (yellow card) 48'; Colwill 24'; Robinson (yellow card) 39', (goal) 75'; Ng (yellow card) 42'; El Ghazi 52'; Willock 80'	BBC report Sky report	Cissoko (red card) 41'; Edwards (yellow card) 88'	Stadium: Cardiff City Stadium; Attendance: 20,634; Referee: Andrew Kitchen
Note: Fixture was initially scheduled for a 15:00 kick-off, but was moved for live Sky Sports broadcast.

22 October 2024 11	Cardiff City	2–0	Portsmouth	Leckwith
19:45 BST	Poole 6' (o.g.); Robinson 13'	BBC report Sky report		Stadium: Cardiff City Stadium; Attendance: 18,534; Referee: Oliver Langford

26 October 2024 12	West Bromwich Albion	0–0	Cardiff City	West Bromwich
15:00 BST		BBC report Sky report		Stadium: The Hawthorns; Attendance: 23,978; Referee: Josh Smith

2 November 2024 13	Cardiff City	2–1	Norwich City	Leckwith
15:00 GMT	Robinson 89'; O'Dowda 90+3'	BBC report Sky report	Borja Sainz 52'	Stadium: Cardiff City Stadium; Attendance: 19,032; Referee: Lewis Smith

6 November 2024 14	Luton Town	1–0	Cardiff City	Luton
20:00 GMT	Brown 57'	BBC report Sky report		Stadium: Kenilworth Road; Attendance: 10,655; Referee: Matt Donohue
Note: Fixture was initially scheduled for a 19:45 kick-off, but was moved for live Sky Sports broadcast.

9 November 2024 15	Cardiff City	1–3	Blackburn Rovers	Leckwith
12:30 GMT	Turnbull 73'	BBC report Sky report	Weimann 15', 54'; Baker 86'	Stadium: Cardiff City Stadium; Attendance: 17,188; Referee: Gavin Ward
Note: Fixture was initially scheduled for a 15:00 kick-off, but was moved for live Sky Sports broadcast.

23 November 2024 16	Sheffield Wednesday	1–1	Cardiff City	Owlerton
12:30 GMT	Bernard 36'	BBC report Sky report	Tanner 34'	Stadium: Hillsborough Stadium; Attendance: 23,974; Referee: Andrew Kitchen
Note: Fixture was initially scheduled for a 15:00 kick-off, but was moved for live Sky Sports broadcast.

27 November 2024 17	Cardiff City	0–2	Queens Park Rangers	Leckwith
19:45 GMT		BBC report Sky report	Celar 40', 90+1'	Stadium: Cardiff City Stadium; Attendance: 16,205; Referee: Stephen Martin
Note: Live on Sky Sports Extra

30 November 2024 18	Coventry City	2–2	Cardiff City	Coventry
15:00 GMT	Mason-Clark 7'; Torp 88' (pen.)	BBC report Sky report	Meite 4'; Robertson 48'	Stadium: Coventry Building Society Arena; Attendance: 27,137; Referee: James Bell

11 December 2024 20	Cardiff City	0–2	Preston North End	Leckwith
19:45 GMT		BBC report Sky report	Chambers 48' (o.g.); Osmajić 90+3'	Stadium: Cardiff City Stadium; Attendance: 15,006; Referee: James Linington
Note: Live on Sky Sports+

14 December 2024 21	Stoke City	2–2	Cardiff City	Stoke-on-Trent
15:00 GMT	Moran 17', (yellow card) 23'; Wilmot (yellow card) 65'; Gibson (yellow card) 66', (goal) 90+5'; Phillips (yellow card) 67'	BBC report Sky report	El Ghazi 32'; Ralls (yellow card) 43'; Gibson 72' (o.g.)	Stadium: Bet365 Stadium; Attendance: 20,847; Referee: Josh Smith

21 December 2024 22	Cardiff City	0–2	Sheffield United	Leckwith
15:00 GMT		BBC report Sky report	Moore 65', 73'	Stadium: Cardiff City Stadium; Attendance: 18,312; Referee: Darren Bond

26 December 2024 23	Oxford United	3–2	Cardiff City	Littlemore
15:00 GMT	Harris 41'; Brown 53'; Placheta 57'	BBC report Sky report	Ashford 82'; Robinson 90+5'	Stadium: Kassam Stadium; Attendance: 11,494; Referee: Gavin Ward
Note: Live on Sky Sports+

29 December 2024 24	Watford	1–2	Cardiff City	Watford
15:00 GMT	Chakvetadze 38'	BBC report Sky report	Robinson 1', 42'	Stadium: Vicarage Road; Attendance: 19,916; Referee: Sam Allison

1 January 2025 25	Cardiff City	1–1	Coventry City	Leckwith
15:00 GMT	Robertson 46'; Robinson (red card) 47'	BBC report Sky report	Sakamoto 46'	Stadium: Cardiff City Stadium; Attendance: 19045; Referee: Geoff Eltringham (replaced after 17 minutes by fourth official James Durkin)
Note: Live on SkySports+

4 January 2025 26	Middlesbrough	1–1	Cardiff City	Middlesbrough
15:00 GMT	Latte Lath 12'	BBC report Sky report	Chambers 21'	Stadium: Riverside Stadium; Attendance: 24,634; Referee: Tom Nield

14 January 2025 19	Cardiff City	1–1	Watford	Leckwith
19:45 GMT	Ashford 65'	BBC report Sky report	Bayo 87'	Stadium: Cardiff City Stadium; Attendance: 16,942; Referee: Oliver Langford
Note: Fixture was originally scheduled for 7 December, but was postponed following advice received from the Met Office and the recommendations of Cardiff Council and South Wales Police.

18 January 2025 27	Cardiff City	3–0	Swansea City	Leckwith
12:30 GMT	Robinson 47', 51'; Goutas 67'	BBC report Sky report		Stadium: Cardiff City Stadium; Attendance: 26,536; Referee: James Bell
Note: Fixture was initially scheduled for a 15:00 kick-off, but was moved for live Sky Sports broadcasting.

21 January 2025 28	Millwall	2–2	Cardiff City	Bermondsey
20:00 GMT	Scanlon 2'; De Norre 19'	BBC report Sky report	Willock 45+1'; Salech 90+7'	Stadium: The Den; Attendance: 12,041; Referee: David Webb
Note: Fixture was initially scheduled for a 19:45 kick-off, but was moved for live Sky Sports broadcasting.

25 January 2025 29	Cardiff City	2–1	Derby County	Leckwith
15:00 GMT	Chambers (yellow card) 45+4'; Ng (yellow card) 59'; Robinson 62'; El Ghazi 64'	BBC report Sky report	Salvesen 70'; Elder (yellow card) 75'	Stadium: Cardiff City Stadium; Attendance: 19,548; Referee: Dean Whitestone

1 February 2025 30	Leeds United	7–0	Cardiff City	Leeds
15:00 GMT	Aaronson 6'; Solomon 13'; James 50'; Piroe 65' (pen.), 90+5'; Gnonto 67'; Mateo Joseph 88'	BBC report Sky report		Stadium: Elland Road; Attendance: 35,810; Referee: Michael Salisbury

11 February 2025 32	Portsmouth	2–1	Cardiff City	Milton, Portsmouth
19:45 GMT	Bishop 9'; Shaughnessy 17'	BBC report Sky report	O'Dowda 22'	Stadium: Fratton Park; Attendance: 20,251; Referee: Tom Nield
Note: Live on Sky Sports+

15 February 2025 33	Cardiff City	1–1	Bristol City	Leckwith
12:30 GMT	Salech 90'	BBC report Sky report	Knight 60'	Stadium: Cardiff City Stadium; Attendance: 22,433; Referee: Tony Harrington
Note: Fixture was initially scheduled for a 15:00 kick-off, but was moved for live Sky Sports broadcasting.

22 February 2025 34	Plymouth Argyle	1–1	Cardiff City	Plymouth
12:30 GMT	Tijani 67', (yellow card) 90+8'; Randell (yellow card) 82'; Talovierov (yellow card) 90+4'; Katić (yellow card) 90+6'	BBC report Sky report	Salech 12'; Goutas (red card) 53'; Rinomhota (yellow card) 90+3'; Ng (yellow card) 90+8'; Mannsverk (yellow card) 90+12'	Stadium: Home Park; Attendance: 16,981; Referee: James Bell
Note: Fixture was initially scheduled for a 15:00 kick-off, but was moved for live Sky Sports broadcasting.

25 February 2025 31	Cardiff City	1–0	Hull City	Leckwith
19:45 GMT	Robinson 52'	BBC report Sky report		Stadium: Cardiff City Stadium; Attendance: 16,622; Referee: Thomas Kirk
Note: Fixture was initially scheduled for 8 February, but was moved due to FA Cup involvements. Live on Sky Sports+

4 March 2025 35	Cardiff City	1–2	Burnley	Leckwith
19:45 GMT	Salech 42'	BBC report Sky report	Brownhill 19'; Estève 40'	Stadium: Cardiff City Stadium; Attendance: 15,713; Referee: James Linington
Note: Fixture was initially scheduled for 1 March, but was rearranged due to FA Cup involvements. Live on Sky Sports+

8 March 2025 36	Sunderland	2–1	Cardiff City	Sunderland
15:00 GMT	Mayenda 2'; Hjelde (yellow card) 56'; Mepham 77'	BBC report Sky report	Davies 41'; Chambers (yellow card) 63'; Bagan (yellow card) 69'	Stadium: Stadium of Light; Attendance: 40,644; Referee: Darren Bond

11 March 2025 37	Cardiff City	1–2	Luton Town	Leckwith
19:45 GMT	Chambers 50'	BBC report Sky report	Clark 57'; Aasgaard 80'	Stadium: Cardiff City Stadium; Attendance: 16,641; Referee: Andy Davies
Note: Live on Sky Sports+

15 March 2025 38	Blackburn Rovers	1–2	Cardiff City	Blackburn
15:00 GMT	Ohashi 16'	BBC report Sky report EFL report	Salech 4'; Chambers (yellow card) 13'; Méïté 73'	Stadium: Ewood Park; Attendance: 13,456; Referee: Adam Herczeg

29 March 2025 39	Cardiff City	1–1	Sheffield Wednesday	Leckwith
15:00GMT	Isaak Davies 21'	BBC report Sky report	Ihiekwe 61'	Stadium: Cardiff City Stadium; Attendance: 20,460; Referee: Sam Allison

5 April 2025 40	Queens Park Rangers	0–0	Cardiff City	Shepherd's Bush
15:00 BST		BBC report Sky report		Stadium: Loftus Road; Attendance: 17,066; Referee: Dean Whitestone

8 April 2025 41	Preston North End	2–2	Cardiff City	Preston
19:45 BST	Osmajić 19'; Þórðarson 72'	BBC report Sky report	Alves 52'; Méïté 90+4'	Stadium: Deepdale; Attendance: 13,293; Referee: David Webb
Note: Live on Sky Sports+

12 April 2025 42	Cardiff City	0–1	Stoke City	Leckwith
15:00 BST		BBC report Sky report	Fish 85' (o.g.)	Stadium: Cardiff City Stadium; Attendance: 20,658; Referee: Michael Salisbury

18 April 2025 43	Sheffield United	2–0	Cardiff City	Sheffield
17:30 BST	Hamer 33'; Brereton Diaz 87'	BBC report Sky report		Stadium: Bramall Lane; Attendance: 28,201; Referee: Tony Harrington
Note: Fixture was initially scheduled for a 15:00 kick-off, but was moved for live Sky Sports broadcasting.

21 April 2025 44	Cardiff City	1–1	Oxford United	Leckwith
15:00 BST	Salech 56'	BBC report Sky report	Brannagan 79'	Stadium: Cardiff City Stadium; Attendance: 23,407; Referee: Farai Hallam
Note: Live on Sky Sports+

26 April 2025 45	Cardiff City	0–0	West Bromwich Albion	Leckwith
15:00 BST		BBC report Sky report		Stadium: Cardiff City Stadium; Attendance: 23,710; Referee: Andrew Kitchen

3 May 2025 46	Norwich City	4–2	Cardiff City	Norwich
12:30 BST	Núñez 13', 17'; Sainz 23'; Wright (yellow card) 36'; Stacey (yellow card) 42'; Duffy 67'; Doyle (yellow card) 73'	BBC report Sky report	Ralls (yellow card) 10'; Chambers (red card) 16'; Salech 56' (pen.), 84'; Bagan (yellow card) 64'	Stadium: Carrow Road; Attendance: 26,581; Referee: Will Finnie

=== FA Cup ===
Cardiff City entered the competition in the third round, and were drawn away against Sheffield United. In the fifth round they were drawn away against Aston Villa.

Win Draw Loss Fixtures

9 January 2025 Third round	Sheffield United	0–1	Cardiff City	Sheffield
19:00 GMT		BBC report Sky report	Ashford 19'	Stadium: Bramall Lane; Attendance: 6,126; Referee: Adam Herczeg
Note: Live on BBC One Wales TV

8 February 2025 Fourth round	Stoke City	3–3 (a.e.t.) (2–4 p)	Cardiff City	Stoke-on-Trent
15:00 GMT	Koumas 42', 46'; Baker 57' (pen.); Gibson (yellow card) 90+7'	BBC report Sky report	Colwill 8', 68', (yellow card) 88'; Salech 19'; O'Dowda (yellow card) 90+8'; Fish (yellow card) 98'	Stadium: Bet365 Stadium; Attendance: 12,641; Referee: Thomas Kirk
	Penalties
	Tezgel (penalty scored); Seko (penalty missed); Rose (penalty missed); Burger (penalty scored)		(penalty scored) Ralls; (penalty missed) Salech; (penalty scored) Chambers; (penalty scored) Willock; (penalty scored) Colwill

28 February 2025 Fifth round	Aston Villa	2–0	Cardiff City	Aston
20:00 GMT	Asensio 68', 80'	BBC report Sky report		Stadium: Villa Park; Attendance: 40,175; Referee: Peter Bankes
Note: Live on ITV

=== EFL Cup ===
On 27 June, the draw for the first round was made, with Cardiff being drawn at home against Bristol Rovers. In the second round, they were drawn at home to Southampton.

Win Draw Loss Fixtures

13 August 2024 First round	Cardiff City	2–0	Bristol Rovers	Leckwith
19:45 BST	McGuinness (yellow card) 32', (goal) 68'; Colwill 90+1'	BBC Report	Anthony (yellow card) 77'	Stadium: Cardiff City Stadium; Attendance: 5,718

28 August 2024 Second round	Cardiff City	3–5	Southampton	Leckwith
19:45 BST	Colwill 21', (yellow card) 36'; Edwards 48' (o.g.); Robertson 57'; Fagan-Walcott (yellow card) 89'	BBC report Sky report EFL report	Fernandes 10'; Amo-Ameyaw 30'; Dibling (yellow card) 53'; Archer 55', 90+4'; Bree (yellow card) 69', (goal) 90+1'; Wood (yellow card) 73'	Stadium: Cardiff City Stadium; Attendance: 7,225; Referee: Tom Nield

== Statistics ==
=== Appearances and goals ===
Players with no appearances are not included on the list

No.	Pos	Nat	Player	Total		Championship		FA Cup		EFL Cup	
No.	Pos	Nat	Player	Apps	Goals	Apps	Goals	Apps	Goals	Apps	Goals
1	GK	(United States) USA	Ethan Horvath	20	0	17+0	0	3+0	0	0+0	0
2	DF	(England) ENG	Will Fish	24	0	14+7	0	3+0	0	0+0	0
4	DF	(Greece) GRE	Dimitrios Goutas	36	1	33+1	1	1+0	0	1+0	0
5	DF	(Norway) NOR	Jesper Daland	22	0	16+4	0	1+1	0	0+0	0
8	MF	(England) ENG	Joe Ralls	23	0	15+6	0	1+1	0	0+0	0
9	FW	(England) ENG	Kion Etete	1	0	0+0	0	1+0	0	0+0	0
10	MF	(Wales) WAL	Aaron Ramsey	10	0	6+2	0	2+0	0	0+0	0
11	MF	(Republic of Ireland) IRL	Callum O'Dowda	43	2	41+1	2	0+1	0	0+0	0
12	DF	(England) ENG	Calum Chambers	42	2	41+0	2	0+1	0	0+0	0
14	MF	(Scotland) SCO	David Turnbull	19	1	10+9	1	0+0	0	0+0	0
15	MF	(Norway) NOR	Sivert Mannsverk	15	0	12+2	0	1+0	0	0+0	0
16	FW	(England) ENG	Chris Willock	34	2	17+15	2	2+0	0	0+0	0
17	DF	(Nigeria) NGR	Jamilu Collins	3	0	2+1	0	0+0	0	0+0	0
18	MF	(Australia) AUS	Alexander Robertson	39	4	29+6	3	0+2	0	1+1	1
19	FW	(Ivory Coast) CIV	Yakou Méïté	34	3	11+23	3	0+0	0	0+0	0
20	FW	(Netherlands) NED	Anwar El Ghazi	27	3	14+11	3	2+0	0	0+0	0
21	GK	(England) ENG	Jak Alnwick	31	0	29+0	0	0+0	0	2+0	0
22	FW	(Denmark) DEN	Yousef Salech	22	9	14+6	8	1+1	1	0+0	0
23	DF	(Republic of Ireland) IRL	Joel Bagan	36	0	17+14	0	2+1	0	2+0	0
24	MF	(Wales) WAL	Eli King	1	0	0+0	0	0+0	0	1+0	0
25	MF	(Wales) WAL	Kieron Evans	1	0	0+0	0	0+0	0	0+1	0
27	MF	(Wales) WAL	Rubin Colwill	48	5	24+19	1	3+0	2	2+0	2
29	MF	(England) ENG	Will Alves	15	1	8+6	1	0+1	0	0+0	0
32	FW	(England) ENG	Ollie Tanner	31	2	15+14	2	1+0	0	0+1	0
35	MF	(Zimbabwe) ZIM	Andy Rinomhota	34	0	24+6	0	1+1	0	2+0	0
36	MF	(England) ENG	Raheem Conte	2	0	0+0	0	0+0	0	2+0	0
38	DF	(England) ENG	Perry Ng	37	1	31+4	1	2+0	0	0+0	0
39	FW	(Wales) WAL	Isaak Davies	10	2	3+6	2	0+1	0	0+0	0
43	MF	(England) ENG	Adeteye Gbadehan	1	0	0+0	0	0+0	0	1+0	0
44	DF	(Wales) WAL	Ronan Kpakio	6	0	1+2	0	1+0	0	2+0	0
45	MF	(Wales) WAL	Cian Ashford	31	3	17+11	2	1+1	1	1+0	0
46	FW	(England) ENG	Michael Reindorf	4	0	0+2	0	0+0	0	1+1	0
47	FW	(Republic of Ireland) IRL	Callum Robinson	35	12	24+10	12	1+0	0	0+0	0
48	DF	(Wales) WAL	Dylan Lawlor	2	0	0+1	0	1+0	0	0+0	0
49	DF	(Wales) WAL	Luey Giles	3	0	0+0	0	2+0	0	1+0	0
50	FW	(Wales) WAL	Isaac Jefferies	1	0	0+0	0	0+0	0	0+1	0
52	MF	(Wales) WAL	Cody Twose	1	0	0+0	0	0+0	0	0+1	0
53	FW	(Wales) WAL	Tanatswa Nyakuhwa	1	0	0+1	0	0+0	0	0+0	0
56	FW	(Republic of Ireland) IRL	Luke Pearce	1	0	0+0	0	0+1	0	0+0	0
Player(s) who featured whilst on loan but returned to parent club during the season:
15	FW	(Ivory Coast) CIV	Wilfried Kanga	16	0	5+10	0	0+0	0	1+0	0
Player(s) who featured but departed the club permanently during the season:
3	MF	(Greece) GRE	Manolis Siopis	22	0	16+5	0	0+1	0	0+0	0
5	DF	(Republic of Ireland) IRL	Mark McGuinness	1	1	0+0	0	0+0	0	1+0	1
31	DF	(England) ENG	Malachi Fagan-Walcott	3	0	0+1	0	0+0	0	1+1	0
37	DF	(Wales) WAL	Thomas Davies	1	0	0+0	0	0+1	0	0+0	0

=== Goals record ===
Rank	No.	Nat.	Po.	Name	Championship	FA Cup	EFL Cup	Total
1	47	(Republic of Ireland)	CF	Callum Robinson	12	0	0	12
2	22	(Denmark)	CF	Yousef Salech	8	1	0	9
3	27	(Wales)	AM	Rubin Colwill	1	2	2	5
4	18	(Australia)	CM	Alex Robertson	3	0	1	4
5=	19	(Ivory Coast)	RW	Yakou Méïté	3	0	0	3
5=	20	(Netherlands)	RW	Anwar El Ghazi	3	0	0	3
5=	45	(Wales)	LW	Cian Ashford	2	1	0	3
5=	Own Goals				2	0	1	3
9=	11	(Republic of Ireland)	LB	Callum O'Dowda	2	0	0	2
9=	12	(England)	CB	Calum Chambers	2	0	0	2
9=	16	(England)	LW	Chris Willock	2	0	0	2
9=	32	(England)	RW	Ollie Tanner	2	0	0	2
9=	39	(Wales)	CF	Isaak Davies	2	0	0	2
14=	4	(Greece)	CB	Dimitrios Goutas	1	0	0	1
14=	5	(Republic of Ireland)	CB	Mark McGuinness	0	0	1	1
14=	14	(Scotland)	CM	David Turnbull	1	0	0	1
14=	29	(England)	AM	Will Alves	1	0	0	1
14=	38	(England)	RB	Perry Ng	1	0	0	1
Total					48	4	5	57

=== Assists record ===
Rank	No.	Nat.	Po.	Name	Championship	FA Cup	EFL Cup	Total
1	27	(Wales)	AM	Rubin Colwill	4	0	0	4
2=	11	(Republic of Ireland)	LB	Callum O'Dowda	3	0	0	3
2=	18	(Australia)	CM	Alex Robertson	3	0	0	3
2=	29	(England)	AM	Will Alves	3	0	0	3
2=	32	(England)	RW	Ollie Tanner	2	0	1	3
2=	45	(Wales)	AM	Cian Ashford	3	0	0	3
7=	16	(England)	LW	Chris Willock	2	0	0	2
7=	20	(Netherlands)	RW	Anwar El Ghazi	1	1	0	2
7=	23	(Republic of Ireland)	LB	Joel Bagan	1	1	0	2
10=	4	(Greece)	CB	Dimitrios Goutas	1	0	0	1
10=	8	(England)	CB	Joe Ralls	1	0	0	1
10=	12	(England)	CB	Calum Chambers	1	0	0	1
10=	15	(Norway)	DM	Sivert Mannsverk	1	0	0	1
10=	22	(Denmark)	CF	Yousef Salech	1	0	0	1
10=	25	(Wales)	AM	Kieron Evans	0	0	1	1
10=	35	(Zimbabwe)	CM	Andy Rinomhota	1	0	0	1
10=	36	(England)	DM	Raheem Conte	0	0	1	1
10=	38	(England)	RB	Perry Ng	1	0	0	1
10=	44	(Wales)	RB	Ronan Kpakio	1	0	0	1
10=	46	(England)	CF	Michael Reindorf	0	0	1	1
10=	47	(Republic of Ireland)	CF	Callum Robinson	1	0	0	1
Total					31	2	4	37

=== Disciplinary record ===
Rank	No.	Nat.	Po.	Name	Championship			FA Cup			EFL Cup			Total		
Rank	No.	Nat.	Po.	Name	Yellow card	(yellow card) (yellow-red card)	Red card	Yellow card	(yellow card) (yellow-red card)	Red card	Yellow card	(yellow card) (yellow-red card)	Red card	Yellow card	(yellow card) (yellow-red card)	Red card
1	12	(England)	CB	Calum Chambers	8	0	1	0	0	0	0	0	0	8	0	1
2	38	(England)	RB	Perry Ng	9	0	0	0	0	0	0	0	0	9	0	0
3	11	(Republic of Ireland)	LM	Callum O'Dowda	7	0	0	1	0	0	0	0	0	8	0	0
4=	18	(Australia)	CM	Alex Robertson	7	0	0	0	0	0	0	0	0	7	0	0
4=	23	(Republic of Ireland)	LB	Joel Bagan	4	0	1	0	0	0	0	0	0	4	0	1
6=	4	(Greece)	CB	Dimitrios Goutas	3	0	1	0	0	0	0	0	0	3	0	1
6=	8	(England)	CM	Joe Ralls	6	0	0	0	0	0	0	0	0	6	0	0
6=	35	(Zimbabwe)	CM	Andy Rinomhota	6	0	0	0	0	0	0	0	0	6	0	0
9	2	(England)	CB	Will Fish	4	0	0	1	0	0	0	0	0	5	0	0
10=	3	(Greece)	CM	Manolis Siopis	4	0	0	0	0	0	0	0	0	4	0	0
10=	15	(Norway)	DM	Sivert Mannsverk	4	0	0	0	0	0	0	0	0	4	0	0
10=	27	(Wales)	AM	Rubin Colwill	2	0	0	1	0	0	1	0	0	4	0	0
10=	47	(Republic of Ireland)	LW	Callum Robinson	1	0	1	0	0	0	0	0	0	1	0	1
14=	5	(Norway)	CB	Jesper Daland	2	0	0	0	0	0	0	0	0	2	0	0
14=	14	(Scotland)	CM	David Turnbull	2	0	0	0	0	0	0	0	0	2	0	0
14=	21	(England)	GK	Jak Alnwick	2	0	0	0	0	0	0	0	0	2	0	0
14=	22	(Denmark)	CF	Yousef Salech	2	0	0	0	0	0	0	0	0	2	0	0
18=	5	(Republic of Ireland)	CB	Mark McGuinness	0	0	0	0	0	0	1	0	0	1	0	0
18=	10	(Wales)	CM	Aaron Ramsey	1	0	0	0	0	0	0	0	0	1	0	0
18=	17	(Nigeria)	LB	Jamilu Collins	1	0	0	0	0	0	0	0	0	1	0	0
18=	19	(Ivory Coast)	CF	Yakou Méïté	1	0	0	0	0	0	0	0	0	1	0	0
18=	31	(England)	CB	Malachi Fagan-Walcott	0	0	0	0	0	0	1	0	0	1	0	0
18=	32	(England)	RW	Ollie Tanner	1	0	0	0	0	0	0	0	0	1	0	0
18=	39	(Wales)	CF	Isaak Davies	1	0	0	0	0	0	0	0	0	1	0	0
Total					77	0	4	3	0	0	3	0	0	83	0	4
