= Rob Tankiewicz =

Welsh footballer

Personal information
- Full name: Robert Mariusz Tankiewicz
- Date of birth: 12 June 2009 (age 17)
- Place of birth: Cardiff, Wales
- Position: Midfielder

Team information
- Current team: Cardiff City
- Number: 33

Youth career
- 2017–2025: Cardiff City

Senior career*
Years	Team	Apps	(Gls)
2025–	Cardiff City	1	(0)

International career^{‡}
2023–2024	Wales U15	8	(1)
2024–2025	Wales U16	6	(0)
2025–2026	Wales U17	7	(0)
2026–	Wales U19	4	(0)
- * Club domestic league appearances and goals as of 17:15, 27 August 2025 (UTC) ‡ National team caps and goals as of 17:05, 6 October 2025 (UTC)

Robert Tankiewicz (born 12 June 2009) is a Welsh professional footballer who plays as a midfielder for EFL Championship club Cardiff City.

== Club career ==
Tankiewicz joined the youth academy of Cardiff City as a U9, and started training with their senior team in September 2025. He made his senior and professional debut with Cardiff City as a substitute in a 1–0 EFL Trophy loss to Newport County on 7 October 2025. He was briefly Cardiff City's youngest ever player after his debut, although his teammate Axel Donczew took the record after being substituted in a couple of minutes later.

== International career ==
He was called up to the Wales U16s for a friendly tournament in September 2024. In August 2025, he was called up to the Wales U17s. In June 2026 Tankiewicz was called up to the Wales under-19 squad. In September 2026, he received his first call up to the Wales Under-21 squad.
